= List of Cassidinae genera =

This is a list of 339 genera in the subfamily Cassidinae, tortoise beetles and hispines.

== Cassidinae genera ==
- Acanthodes Baly, 1864^{i c g}
- Acentroptera Guérin-Méneville, 1844^{i c g}
- Acmenychus Weise, 1905^{i c g}
- Acritispa Uhmann, 1940^{i c g}
- Acrocassis Spaeth, 1922^{i c g}
- Acromis Chevrolat in Dejean, 1836^{i c g}
- Adalurnus Maulik, 1936^{i c g}
- Aethiopocassis Spaeth, 1922^{i c g}
- Agathispa Weise, 1905^{i c g}
- Agenysa Spaeth, 1905^{i c g}
- Agoniella Weise, 1911^{i c g}
- Agonita Strand, 1942^{i c g}
- Agroiconota Spaeth, 1913^{i c g b}
- Aidoia Spaeth, 1952^{i c g}
- Alurnus Fabricius, 1775^{i c g}
- Amblispa Baly, 1858^{i c g}
- Amythra Spaeth, 1913^{i c g}
- Anacassis Spaeth, 1913^{i c g}
- Andevocassis Spaeth, 1924^{i c g}
- Androya Spaeth, 1911^{i c g}
- Anepsiomorpha Spaeth, 1913^{i c g}
- Anisochalepus Uhmann, 1940^{i c g}
- Anisodera Chevrolat in Dejean, 1836^{i c g}
- Anisostena Weise, 1910^{i c g b}
- Aporocassida Spaeth, 1952^{i c g}
- Aproida Pascoe, 1863^{i c g}
- Arescus Perty, 1832^{i c g}
- Asamangulia Maulik, 1915^{i c g}
- Aslamidium Borowiec, 1984^{i c g}
- Aspidimorpha Hope, 1840^{i c g}
- Aspidispa Baly, 1869^{i c g}
- Asteriza Chevrolat in Dejean, 1836^{i c g}
- Aulostyrax Maulik, 1929^{i c g}
- Austropsecadia Hincks, 1950^{i c g}
- Baliosus Weise, 1905^{i c g b}
- Balyana Péringuey, 1898^{i c g}
- Basiprionota Chevrolat in Dejean, 1836^{i c g}
- Basipta Chevrolat, 1849^{i c g}
- Botanochara Dejean, 1836^{i c g}
- Bothrispa Uhmann, 1940^{i c}
- Bothryonopa Guérin-Méneville, 1840^{i c g}
- Brachycoryna Guérin-Méneville, 1844^{i c g b}
- Bradycassis Spaeth, 1952^{i c g}
- Brontispa Sharp, 1904^{i c g}
- Bruchia Weise, 1906^{i c g}
- Bulolispa Gressitt and Samuelson, 1990^{i c g}
- Calamispa Gressitt, 1957^{i c g}
- Caledonispa Uhmann, 1952^{i c g}
- Callanispa Uhmann, 1959^{i c g}
- Calliaspis Dejean, 1836^{i c g}
- Callispa Baly, 1858^{i c g}
- Callistola Dejean, 1836^{i c g}
- Callohispa Uhmann, 1960^{i c g}
- Calyptocephala Chevrolat in Dejean, 1836^{i c g}
- Canistra Erichson, 1847^{i c g}
- Capelocassis Spaeth, 1952^{i c g}
- Carinispa Uhmann, 1930^{i c g}
- Carlobruchia Spaeth, 1911^{i c g}
- Cassida Linnaeus, 1758^{i c g b}
- Cassidinoma Hincks, 1950^{i c g}
- Cassidispa Gestro, 1899^{i c g}
- Cassidopsis Fairmaire, 1899^{i c g}
- Cephaloleia Chevrolat in Dejean, 1836^{i c g}
- Ceratispa Gestro, 1895^{i c g}
- Chacocassis Spaeth, 1952^{i c g}
- Chaeridiona Baly, 1869^{i c g}
- Chalepispa Uhmann, 1955^{i c g}
- Chalepotatus Weise, 1910^{i c g}
- Chalepus Thunberg, 1805^{i c g b}
- Charidotella Weise, 1896^{i c g b}
- Charidotis Boheman, 1854^{i c g}
- Charistena Baly, 1864^{i c g}
- Chelobasis Gray, 1832^{i c g}
- Chelymorpha Chevrolat in Dejean, 1836^{i c g b}
- Chelysida Fairmaire, 1882^{i c g}
- Chersinellina Hincks, 1950^{i c g}
- Chiridopsis Spaeth, 1922^{i c g}
- Chiridula Weise, 1889^{i c g}
- Chlamydocassis Spaeth, 1952^{i c g}
- Chrysispa Weise, 1897^{i c g}
- Cirrispa Uhmann, 1936^{i c g}
- Cistudinella Champion, 1894^{i c g}
- Cladispa Baly, 1858^{i c g}
- Clinocarispa Uhmann, 1935^{i c g}
- Cnestispa Maulik, 1930
- Coelaenomenodera Blanchard, 1845^{i c g}
- Conchyloctenia Spaeth, 1902^{i c g}
- Coptocycla Chevrolat in Dejean, 1836^{i c g b}
- Coraliomela Jacobson, 1899^{i c g}
- Corynispa Uhmann, 1940^{i c g}
- Crambelea Spaeth, 1913^{i c g}
- Craspedonispa Weise, 1910^{i c g}
- Craspedonta Chevrolat in Dejean, 1836^{i c g}
- Cryptonychus Gyllenhal, 1817^{i c g}
- Cteisella Weise, 1896^{i c g}
- Ctenocassida Spaeth, 1926^{i c g}
- Ctenocharidotis Spaeth, 1926^{i c g}
- Ctenophilaspis Spaeth, 1926^{i c g}
- Cubispa Barber, 1946^{i c g}
- Cyclocassis Spaeth, 1913^{i c g}
- Cyclosoma Guérin-Méneville, 1835^{i c g}
- Cyperispa Gressitt, 1957^{i c g}
- Cyrtonota Chevrolat in Dejean, 1836^{i c g}
- Dactylispa Weise, 1897^{i c g}
- Decatelia Weise, 1904^{i c g}
- Delocrania Guérin-Méneville, 1844^{i c g}
- Deloyala Chevrolat in Dejean, 1836^{i c g b}
- Demotispa Baly, 1858^{i c g}
- Dicladispa Gestro, 1897^{i c g}
- Discomorpha Chevrolat in Dejean, 1836^{i c g}
- Dorcathispa Weise, 1901^{i c g}
- Dorynota Chevrolat in Dejean, 1836^{i c g}
- Downesia Baly, 1858^{i c g}
- Drepanocassis Spaeth, 1936^{i c g}
- Drescheria Weise, 1911^{i c g}
- Echoma Chevrolat in Dejean, 1836^{i c g}
- Elytrogona Chevrolat in Dejean, 1836^{i c g}
- Emdenia Spaeth, 1915^{i c g}
- Enagria Spaeth, 1913^{i c g}
- Enischnispa Gressitt, 1957^{i c g}
- Epistictina Hincks, 1950^{i c g}
- Erbolaspis Spaeth, 1924^{i c g}
- Eremionycha Spaeth, 1911^{i c}
- Erepsocassis Spaeth, 1936^{i c g b}
- Estigmena Hope, 1840^{i c g}
- Eugenysa Chevrolat in Dejean, 1836^{i c g}
- Euprionota Guérin-Méneville, 1844^{i c g}
- Eurispa Baly, 1858^{i c g}
- Eurypedus Gistel, 1834^{i c g}
- Eurypepla Boheman, 1854^{i c g}
- Eutheria Spaeth, 1909^{i c g}
- Euxema Baly, 1885^{i c g}
- Exestastica Spaeth, 1909^{i c g}
- Exothispa Kolbe, 1897^{i c g}
- Floridocassis Spaeth in Hincks, 1952^{i c g b}
- Fornicocassis Spaeth, 1917^{i c g}
- Fossispa Staines, 1989^{i c g}
- Gestronella Weise, 1911^{i c g}
- Glyphocassis Spaeth, 1914^{i c g}
- Glyphuroplata Uhmann, 1937^{i c g b}
- Goniochenia Weise, 1896^{i c g}
- Gonophora Chevrolat in Dejean, 1836^{i c g}
- Goyachalepus Pic, 1929^{i c g}
- Gratiana Spaeth, 1913^{i c g b}
- Gyllenhaleus Weise, 1903^{i c g}
- Hemisphaerota Chevrolat in Dejean, 1836^{i c g b}
- Heptachispa Uhmann, 1953^{i c g}
- Heptatomispa Uhmann, 1940^{i c g}
- Heptispa Weise, 1906^{i c g b}
- Herissa Spaeth, 1909^{i c g}
- Herminella Spaeth, 1913^{i c g}
- Heterispa Chapuis, 1875^{i c g}
- Heteronychocassis Spaeth, 1915^{i c g}
- Heterrhachispa Gressitt, 1957^{i c g}
- Hilarocassis Spaeth, 1913^{i c g b}
- Hispa Linnaeus, 1767^{i c g}
- Hispellinus Weise, 1897^{i c g}
- Hispodonta Baly, 1858^{i c g}
- Hispoleptis Baly, 1864^{i c g}
- Homalispa Baly, 1858^{i c g}
- Hovacassis Spaeth, 1952^{i c g}
- Hybosa Duponchel, 1842^{i c g}
- Hybosinota Spaeth, 1909^{i c g}
- Hybosispa Weise, 1910^{i c g}
- Hypocassida Weise, 1893^{i c g}
- Imatidium Fabricius, 1801^{i c g}
- Ischiocassis Spaeth, 1917^{i c g}
- Ischnispa Gressitt, 1963^{i c g}
- Ischnocodia Spaeth, 1942^{i c g}
- Ischyronota Weise, 1891^{i c g}
- Isopedhispa Spaeth, 1936^{i c g}
- Jambhala Würmli, 1975^{i c g}
- Javeta Baly, 1858^{i c g}
- Jonthonota Spaeth, 1913^{i c g b}
- Klitispa Uhmann, 1940^{i c g}
- Laccoptera Boheman, 1855^{i c g}
- Lasiochila Weise, 1916^{i c g}
- Leptispa Baly, 1858^{i c g}
- Leptocodia Spaeth, 1952^{i c g}
- Leucispa Chapuis, 1875^{i c g}
- Limnocassis Spaeth, 1952^{i c g}
- Lorentzocassis Spaeth, 1913^{i c g}
- Macrispa Baly, 1858^{i c g}
- Macromonycha Spaeth, 1911^{i c g}
- Mahatsinia Spaeth, 1919^{i c g}
- Malayocassis Spaeth, 1952^{i c g}
- Mecistomela Jacobson, 1899^{i c g}
- Megapyga Boheman, 1850^{i c g}
- Melanispa Baly, 1858^{i c g}
- Meroscalsis Spaeth, 1903^{i c g}
- Mesomphalia Hope, 1839^{i c g}
- Metazycera Chevrolat in Dejean, 1836^{i c g}
- Metriona Weise, 1896^{i c g}
- Metrionella Spaeth, 1932^{i c g b}
- Metriopepla Fairmaire, 1882^{i c g}
- Mexicaspis Spaeth, 1936^{i c g}
- Micrispa Gestro, 1897^{i c g}
- Microctenochira Spaeth, 1926^{i c g b}
- Microrhopala Chevrolat in Dejean, 1836^{i c g b}
- Mimoethispa Pic, 1927^{i c g}
- Miocalaspis Weise, 1899^{i c g}
- Monagonia Uhmann, 1931^{i c g}
- Nabathaea Spaeth, 1911^{i c g}
- Nanocthispa Monrós and Viana, 1947^{i c g}
- Nebraspis Spaeth, 1913^{i c g}
- Nesohispa Maulik, 1913^{i c g}
- Nilgiraspis Spaeth, 1932^{i c g}
- Nonispa Maulik, 1933^{i c g}
- Notosacantha Chevrolat in Dejean, 1836^{i c g}
- Nuzonia Spaeth, 1912^{i c g}
- Nympharescus Weise, 1905^{i c g}
- Ocnosispa Weise, 1910^{i c g}
- Octhispa Chapuis, 1877^{i c g}
- Octocladiscus Thomson, 1856^{i c g}
- Octodonta Chapuis, 1875^{i c g}
- Octotoma Dejean, 1836^{i g b}
- Octuroplata Uhmann, 1940^{i c g}
- Odontispa Uhmann, 1940^{i c g}
- Odontota Chevrolat in Dejean, 1836^{i c g b}
- Oediopalpa Baly, 1858^{i c g}
- Ogdoecosta Spaeth, 1909^{i c g}
- Omaspides Chevrolat in Dejean, 1836^{i c g}
- Omocerus Chevrolat, 1835^{i c g}
- Omoteina Chevrolat in Dejean, 1836^{i c g}
- Oncocephala Guérin-Méneville, 1844
- Oocassida Weise, 1897^{i c g}
- Opacinota E. Riley, 1986^{i c g b}
- Orexita Spaeth, 1911^{i c g}
- Orobiocassis Spaeth, 1934^{i c g}
- Ovotispa Medvedev, 1992^{i c g}
- Oxycephala Guérin-Méneville, 1838^{i c g}
- Oxychalepus Uhmann, 1937^{i c g}
- Oxylepus Desbrochers, 1884^{i c g}
- Oxyroplata Uhmann, 1940^{i c g}
- Palmispa Gressitt, 1960^{i c g}
- Parachirida Hincks, 1952^{i c g}
- Paranota Monrós and Viana, 1949^{i c g}
- Paraselenis Spaeth, 1913^{i c g}
- Paratrikona Spaeth, 1923^{i c g}
- Parimatidium Spaeth, 1938^{i c g}
- Parorectis Spaeth, 1901^{i c g b}
- Parvispa Uhmann, 1940^{i c g}
- Pentispa Chapuis, 1875^{i c g b}
- Peronycha Weise, 1909^{i c}
- Pharangispa Maulik, 1929^{i c g}
- Phidodontina Uhmann, 1938^{i c g}
- Philodonta Weise, 1904^{i c g}
- Physocoryna Guérin-Méneville, 1844^{i c g}
- Physonota Boheman, 1854^{i c g b}
- Phytodectoidea Spaeth, 1909^{i c g}
- Pilemostoma Desbrochers, 1891^{i c g}
- Pistosia Weise, 1905^{i c g}
- Plagiometriona Spaeth, 1899 (incl. Helocassis)^{i c g b}
- Platocthispa Uhmann, 1939^{i c g}
- Platyauchenia Sturm, 1843^{i c g}
- Platycycla Boheman, 1854^{i c g}
- Platypria Guérin-Méneville, 1840^{i c g}
- Plesispa Chapuis, 1875^{i c g}
- Pleurispa Weise, 1902^{i c g}
- Poecilaspidella Spaeth, 1913^{i c g}
- Polychalca Chevrolat in Dejean, 1836^{i c g}
- Polychalma Barber and Bridwell, 1940^{i c g}
- Polyconia Weise, 1905^{i c g}
- Prionispa Chapuis, 1875^{i c g}
- Probaenia Weise, 1904^{i c g}
- Promecispa Weise, 1909^{i c g}
- Promecotheca Blanchard, 1853^{i c g}
- Prosopodonta Baly, 1858^{i c g}
- Psalidoma Spaeth, 1899^{i c g}
- Pseudandroya Spaeth, 1952^{i c g}
- Pseudispa Chapuis, 1875^{i c g}
- Pseudispella Kraatz, 1895^{i c g}
- Pseudocalaspidea Jacobson, 1899^{i c g}
- Pseudocallispa Uhmann, 1931^{i c g}
- Pseudoctenochira Spaeth, 1926^{i c g}
- Pseudostilpnaspis Borowiec, 2000^{i c g}
- Rhabdotohispa Maulik, 1913^{i c g}
- Rhacocassis Spaeth, 1904^{i c g}
- Rhadinosa Weise, 1905^{i c g}
- Rhoia Spaeth, 1913^{i c g}
- Rhoptrispa Chen and Tan, 1965^{i c g}
- Rhytidocassis Spaeth, 1941^{i c g}
- Saulaspis Spaeth, 1913^{i c g}
- Scaeocassis Spaeth, 1913^{i c g}
- Sceloenopla Chevrolat in Dejean, 1836^{i c g}
- Seminabathea Borowiec, 1994^{i c g}
- Serratispa Staines, 2002^{i c g}
- Silana Spaeth, 1914^{i c g}
- Sinispa Uhmann, 1938^{i c g}
- Smeringaspis Spaeth, 1924^{i c g}
- Solenispa Weise, 1905^{i c g}
- Spaethaspis Hincks, 1952^{i c g}
- Spaethiella Barber and Bridwell, 1940^{i c g}
- Spaethispa Uhmann, 1939^{i c g}
- Sphenocassis Spaeth, 1911^{i c g}
- Spilophora Boheman, 1850^{i c g}
- Squamispa Maulik, 1928^{i c g}
- Stenispa Baly, 1858^{i c g b}
- Stenopodius Horn, 1883^{i c g b}
- Stephanispa Gressitt, 1960^{i c g}
- Sternocthispa Uhmann, 1938^{i c g}
- Sternoplispa Uhmann, 1940^{i c g}
- Sternostena Weise, 1910^{i c g}
- Sternostenoides Monrós and Viana, 1947^{i c g}
- Stethispa Baly, 1864^{i c g}
- Stilpnaspis Weise, 1905^{i c g}
- Stoiba Spaeth, 1909^{i c g}
- Stolas Billberg, 1820^{i c g}
- Strongylocassis Hincks, 1950^{i c g b}
- Sumitrosis Butte, 1969^{i c g b}
- Syngambria Spaeth, 1911^{i c g}
- Tapinaspis Spaeth, 1936^{i c g}
- Tegocassis Spaeth, 1924^{i c g}
- Temnochalepus Uhmann, 1935^{i c g}
- Temnocthispa Uhmann, 1939^{i c g}
- Teretrispa Gressitt, 1960^{i c g}
- Terpsis Spaeth, 1913^{i c g}
- Tetracassis Spaeth, 1952^{i c}
- Thlaspida Weise, 1899^{i c g}
- Thlaspidosoma Spaeth, 1901^{i c g}
- Thlaspidula Spaeth, 1901^{i c g}
- Thomispa Würmli, 1975^{i c g}
- Thoracispa Chapuis, 1875^{i c g}
- Torquispa Uhmann, 1954^{i c g}
- Trichaspis Spaeth, 1911^{i c g}
- Trichispa Chapuis, 1875^{i c g}
- Trigonocassis Hincks, 1950^{i c g}
- Trilaccodea Spaeth, 1902^{i c g}
- Unguispa Uhmann, 1954^{i c g}
- Uroplata Chevrolat in Dejean, 1836^{i c g}
- Vietocassis Medvedev and Eroshkina, 1988^{i c g}
- Wallacispa Uhmann, 1931^{i c g}
- Xenarescus Weise, 1905^{i c g}
- Xenicomorpha Spaeth, 1913^{i c g}
- Xenochalepus Weise, 1910^{i c g b}
- Xiphispa Chapuis, 1878^{i c}
- Zatrephina Spaeth, 1909^{i c g}
- Zeugonota Spaeth, 1913^{i c g}

Data sources: i = ITIS, c = Catalogue of Life, g = GBIF, b = Bugguide.net
