= Stethispa confusa =

Scientific classification
- Kingdom: Animalia
- Phylum: Arthropoda
- Clade: Pancrustacea
- Class: Insecta
- Order: Coleoptera
- Suborder: Polyphaga
- Infraorder: Cucujiformia
- Family: Chrysomelidae
- Genus: Stethispa
- Species: S. confusa

Binomial name
- Stethispa confusa Baly, 1864

Species of beetle

Stethispa confusa is a species of beetle of the family Chrysomelidae. It is found in Brazil (Amazonas).

== Description ==
Adults are very similar to Stethispa gratiosa, the keeled spine at the hinder angles of the elytra will, however, at once distinguish it from that species. There is an indistinctly raised ridge between the insertion of the antennae. The thorax is somewhat deeply depressed transversely behind the middle and the medial line in front is impressed with a longitudinal groove. The surface is deeply but not closely punctured, opaque on the sides and base, shining and still more distantly punctured on the middle of the disk in front. The sides are nearly straight and parallel behind their middle, then rounded an narrowed towards the apex, deeply sinuate immediately behind the anterior angles, the latter produced into an acute tooth. The lateral borders of the elytra are minutely denticulate.

== Biology ==
The food plant is unknown.
