= Heptachispa lineaticollis =

Scientific classification
- Kingdom: Animalia
- Phylum: Arthropoda
- Clade: Pancrustacea
- Class: Insecta
- Order: Coleoptera
- Suborder: Polyphaga
- Infraorder: Cucujiformia
- Family: Chrysomelidae
- Genus: Heptachispa
- Species: H. lineaticollis

Binomial name
- Heptachispa lineaticollis (Pic, 1928)

Synonyms
- Octhispa (Hepthispa) lineaticollis Pic, 1928; Heptispa lineaticollis

Species of beetle

Heptachispa lineaticollis is a species of beetle of the family Chrysomelidae. It is found in Brazil (Goiás, Pernambuco).

== Taxonomy ==
Maurice Pic described this species from Brazil in 1928. The species remained enigmatic to subsequent authors, and was only listed in catalogs. The type series was studied in 2026 and it was concluded that the species belongs to the genus Heptachispa as it shares all principal characters with it (i.e., short robust antennae, irregular rows of punctures between intervals II and III multiplied to three, moderately-sized and stout body. It looks very similar to Heptachispa concava and further comparison of type material would be desirable to see whether they are two distinct species.
