= Decatelia atritarsis =

Scientific classification
- Kingdom: Animalia
- Phylum: Arthropoda
- Class: Insecta
- Order: Coleoptera
- Suborder: Polyphaga
- Infraorder: Cucujiformia
- Family: Chrysomelidae
- Genus: Decatelia
- Species: D. atritarsis

Binomial name
- Decatelia atritarsis Pic, 1927

Species of beetle

Decatelia atritarsis is a species of beetle of the family Chrysomelidae. It is found in Brazil (Goyaz).
