= Temnocthispa jocosa =

Scientific classification
- Kingdom: Animalia
- Phylum: Arthropoda
- Class: Insecta
- Order: Coleoptera
- Suborder: Polyphaga
- Infraorder: Cucujiformia
- Family: Chrysomelidae
- Genus: Temnocthispa
- Species: T. jocosa

Binomial name
- Temnocthispa jocosa Uhmann, 1940

Species of beetle

Temnocthispa jocosa is a species of beetle of the family Chrysomelidae. It is found in Brazil (Amazonas, Para).

== Biology ==
The food plant is unknown.
