= Chalepotatus minor =

Scientific classification
- Kingdom: Animalia
- Phylum: Arthropoda
- Class: Insecta
- Order: Coleoptera
- Suborder: Polyphaga
- Infraorder: Cucujiformia
- Family: Chrysomelidae
- Genus: Chalepotatus
- Species: C. minor

Binomial name
- Chalepotatus minor Weise, 1910

Species of beetle

Chalepotatus minor is a species of beetle of the family Chrysomelidae. It is found in Mexico.
