= Sternostena costaricana =

Scientific classification
- Kingdom: Animalia
- Phylum: Arthropoda
- Class: Insecta
- Order: Coleoptera
- Suborder: Polyphaga
- Infraorder: Cucujiformia
- Family: Chrysomelidae
- Genus: Sternostena
- Species: S. costaricana

Binomial name
- Sternostena costaricana Uhmann, 1938

Species of beetle

Sternostena costaricana is a species of beetle of the family Chrysomelidae. It is found in Colombia and Costa Rica.

== Biology ==
The food plant is unknown.
