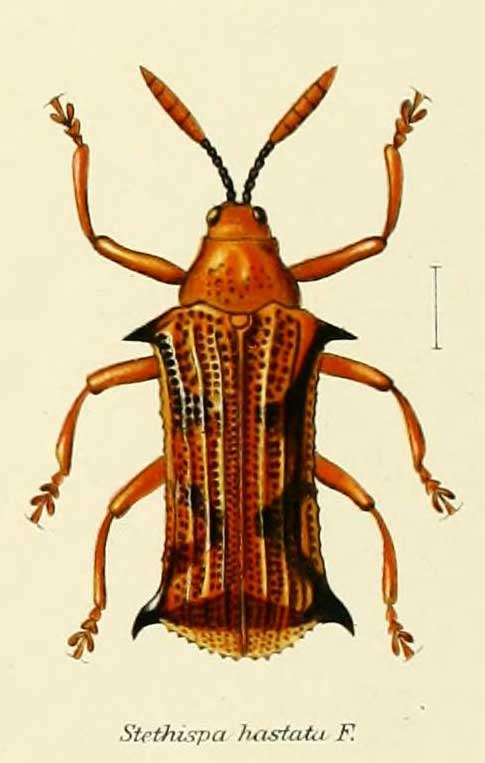

Scientific classification
- Kingdom: Animalia
- Phylum: Arthropoda
- Class: Insecta
- Order: Coleoptera
- Suborder: Polyphaga
- Infraorder: Cucujiformia
- Family: Chrysomelidae
- Genus: Stethispa
- Species: S. hastata

Binomial name
- Stethispa hastata (Fabricius, 1801)

Synonyms
- Hispa hastata Fabricius, 1801

= Stethispa hastata =

Species of beetle

Stethispa hastata is a species of beetle of the family Chrysomelidae. It is found in Peru.

== Biology ==
The food plant is unknown.
