= Acanthispa tarsata =

Scientific classification
- Kingdom: Animalia
- Phylum: Arthropoda
- Clade: Pancrustacea
- Class: Insecta
- Order: Coleoptera
- Suborder: Polyphaga
- Infraorder: Cucujiformia
- Family: Chrysomelidae
- Genus: Acanthispa
- Species: A. tarsata

Binomial name
- Acanthispa tarsata Baly, 1864

Synonyms
- Acanthodes tarsata flavitarsis Weise, 1921

Species of beetle

Acanthispa tarsata is a species of beetle of the family Chrysomelidae. It is found in Brazil and Peru.

== Description ==
The vertex is impressed with a deep longitudinal groove. The thorax is conical, the sides being obliquely narrowed from the base to the apex. On either side, just above the base, is a small, obscure rufous spot. The spine of the elytra is broad, deeply excavated above, produced obliquely outwards and somewhat backwards. The abdomen is very obscure blackish-aeneous, the apical segment stained on either side with an obscure rufous patch.
