= Chalepotatus coarctatus =

Scientific classification
- Kingdom: Animalia
- Phylum: Arthropoda
- Clade: Pancrustacea
- Class: Insecta
- Order: Coleoptera
- Suborder: Polyphaga
- Infraorder: Cucujiformia
- Family: Chrysomelidae
- Genus: Chalepotatus
- Species: C. coarctatus

Binomial name
- Chalepotatus coarctatus (Chapuis, 1877)

Synonyms
- Odontota coarctatus Chapuis, 1877; Chalepotatus coarctatus inapicalis Pic, 1934; Chalepotatus scutulus latenotata Pic, 1929; Chalepotatus scitulus Weise, 1910

Species of beetle

Chalepotatus coarctatus is a species of beetle of the family Chrysomelidae. It is found in Argentina, Brazil (Rio Grande do Sul, São Paulo, Pernambuco) and Paraguay.
