= Charistena ruficollis =

Scientific classification
- Kingdom: Animalia
- Phylum: Arthropoda
- Clade: Pancrustacea
- Class: Insecta
- Order: Coleoptera
- Suborder: Polyphaga
- Infraorder: Cucujiformia
- Family: Chrysomelidae
- Genus: Charistena
- Species: C. ruficollis

Binomial name
- Charistena ruficollis (Fabricius, 1801)

Synonyms
- Hispa ruficollis Fabricius, 1801; Hispa integra Fabricius, 1801; Charistena deyrollei Baly, 1864; Charistena ruficollis lineola Weise, 1921; Charistena regularis Uhmann, 1930

Species of beetle

Charistena ruficollis is a species of beetle of the family Chrysomelidae. It is found in Argentina, Bolivia, Brazil (Bahia, Pernambuco, Minas Gerais, Rio de Janeiro, São Paulo), Colombia, Costa Rica, Ecuador, French Guiana, Nicaragua, Panama, Peru, Suriname and Venezuela.

== Biology ==
They have been recorded feeding on Zea mays, Glycine max, Paspalum conjugatum and Coffea species.
