= Oxyroplata clienta =

Scientific classification
- Kingdom: Animalia
- Phylum: Arthropoda
- Class: Insecta
- Order: Coleoptera
- Suborder: Polyphaga
- Infraorder: Cucujiformia
- Family: Chrysomelidae
- Genus: Oxyroplata
- Species: O. clienta

Binomial name
- Oxyroplata clienta (Weise, 1905)

Synonyms
- Uroplata clienta Weise, 1905; Uroplata clienta diversicolor Pic, 1932

Species of beetle

Oxyroplata clienta is a species of beetle of the family Chrysomelidae. It is found in Brazil.

== Description ==
Adults reach a length of about 8-8.5 mm. They have a black head and body, with reddish-yellow areas.
