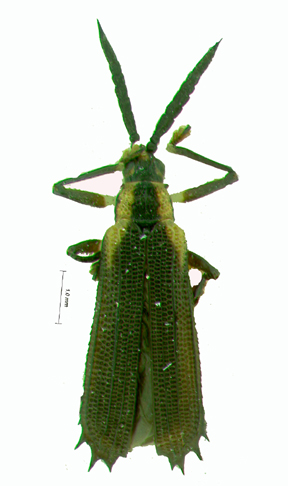

Scientific classification
- Kingdom: Animalia
- Phylum: Arthropoda
- Class: Insecta
- Order: Coleoptera
- Suborder: Polyphaga
- Infraorder: Cucujiformia
- Family: Chrysomelidae
- Genus: Oxyroplata
- Species: O. bellicosa

Binomial name
- Oxyroplata bellicosa (Baly, 1885)

Synonyms
- Uroplata bellicosa Baly, 1885

= Oxyroplata bellicosa =

Species of beetle

Oxyroplata bellicosa is a species of beetle of the family Chrysomelidae. It is found in Costa Rica and Panama.

== Description ==
The head is rather strongly produced between the eyes and the vertex and front are deeply impressed on either side with a longitudinal groove. There is a small obscure fulvous patch on the hinder border of the eye, and one on the anterior portion of the front. The antennae are rigid, half the length of the body, compressed and attenuated towards the apex, the latter acute. The elytron has ten (at the base with eleven) regular rows of punctures, the second, fourth, and eighth interspaces costate.

== Biology ==
They have been recorded feeding on Banisteria argentea.
