= Temnocthispa brevedentata =

Scientific classification
- Kingdom: Animalia
- Phylum: Arthropoda
- Class: Insecta
- Order: Coleoptera
- Suborder: Polyphaga
- Infraorder: Cucujiformia
- Family: Chrysomelidae
- Genus: Temnocthispa
- Species: T. brevedentata

Binomial name
- Temnocthispa brevedentata (Pic, 1933)

Synonyms
- Octhispa brevedentata Pic, 1933

Species of beetle

Temnocthispa brevedentata is a species of beetle of the family Chrysomelidae. It is found in Brazil (Goiás).

== Biology ==
The food plant is unknown.
