= Temnocthispa deplanata =

Scientific classification
- Kingdom: Animalia
- Phylum: Arthropoda
- Class: Insecta
- Order: Coleoptera
- Suborder: Polyphaga
- Infraorder: Cucujiformia
- Family: Chrysomelidae
- Genus: Temnocthispa
- Species: T. deplanata

Binomial name
- Temnocthispa deplanata (Waterhouse, 1881)

Synonyms
- Uroplata deplanata Waterhouse, 1881

Species of beetle

Temnocthispa deplanata is a species of beetle of the family Chrysomelidae. It is found in Ecuador.

== Biology ==
The food plant is unknown.
