= Sternoplispa opacicollis =

Scientific classification
- Kingdom: Animalia
- Phylum: Arthropoda
- Class: Insecta
- Order: Coleoptera
- Suborder: Polyphaga
- Infraorder: Cucujiformia
- Family: Chrysomelidae
- Genus: Sternoplispa
- Species: S. opacicollis

Binomial name
- Sternoplispa opacicollis (Uhmann, 1935)

Synonyms
- Octhispa opacicollis Uhmann, 1935

Species of beetle

Sternoplispa opacicollis is a species of beetle of the family Chrysomelidae. It is found in Brazil (Amazonas).

== Biology ==
The food plant is unknown.
