= Odontispa latipennis =

Scientific classification
- Kingdom: Animalia
- Phylum: Arthropoda
- Clade: Pancrustacea
- Class: Insecta
- Order: Coleoptera
- Suborder: Polyphaga
- Infraorder: Cucujiformia
- Family: Chrysomelidae
- Genus: Odontispa
- Species: O. latipennis

Binomial name
- Odontispa latipennis (Pic, 1928)

Synonyms
- Prosopodonta latipennis Pic, 1928

Species of beetle

Odontispa latipennis is a species of beetle in the family Chrysomelidae. It is known only from Rio de Janeiro in Brazil, and its host plant is unknown. This species was described by French entomologist Maurice Pic in 1928 as Prosopodonta latipennis, but would later be transferred to the genus Odontispa, for which it is the type species, by the German entomologist Erich Uhmann in 1940. The holotype specimen, collected from Neufreiburg, is held in the collection of the National Museum of Natural History in Paris, France.
