= Stethispa unimaculata =

Scientific classification
- Kingdom: Animalia
- Phylum: Arthropoda
- Class: Insecta
- Order: Coleoptera
- Suborder: Polyphaga
- Infraorder: Cucujiformia
- Family: Chrysomelidae
- Genus: Stethispa
- Species: S. unimaculata

Binomial name
- Stethispa unimaculata Pic, 1929

Species of beetle

Stethispa unimaculata is a species of beetle of the family Chrysomelidae. It is found in Costa Rica.

== Biology ==
The food plant is unknown.
