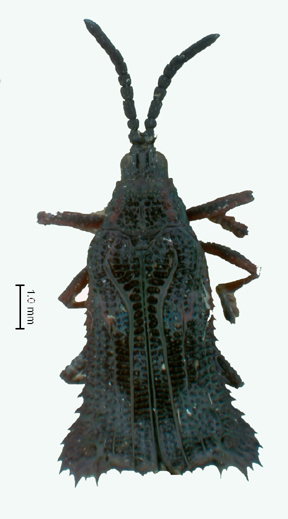

Scientific classification
- Kingdom: Animalia
- Phylum: Arthropoda
- Class: Insecta
- Order: Coleoptera
- Suborder: Polyphaga
- Infraorder: Cucujiformia
- Family: Chrysomelidae
- Genus: Euprionota
- Species: E. gebieni

Binomial name
- Euprionota gebieni (Uhmann, 1930)

Synonyms
- Penthispa (Euprionota) gebieni Uhmann, 1930

= Euprionota gebieni =

Species of beetle

Euprionota gebieni is a species of beetle of the family Chrysomelidae. It is found in Costa Rica, El Salvador and Guatemala.

== Biology ==
They have been recorded feeding on Veronia species.
