= Bruchia scapularis =

Scientific classification
- Kingdom: Animalia
- Phylum: Arthropoda
- Clade: Pancrustacea
- Class: Insecta
- Order: Coleoptera
- Suborder: Polyphaga
- Infraorder: Cucujiformia
- Family: Chrysomelidae
- Genus: Bruchia
- Species: B. scapularis

Binomial name
- Bruchia scapularis Staines, 2007

Species of beetle

Bruchia scapularis is a species of beetle in the family Chrysomelidae. It is found in Colombia.
