= Acanthispa nigripennis =

Scientific classification
- Kingdom: Animalia
- Phylum: Arthropoda
- Clade: Pancrustacea
- Class: Insecta
- Order: Coleoptera
- Suborder: Polyphaga
- Infraorder: Cucujiformia
- Family: Chrysomelidae
- Genus: Acanthispa
- Species: A. nigripennis

Binomial name
- Acanthispa nigripennis Baly, 1864

Species of beetle

Acanthispa nigripennis is a species of beetle of the family Chrysomelidae. It is found in French Guiana.

== Description ==
Adults are elongate and shining red, while the head, a short vitta on either side of the thorax, its extreme apical margin, together with the elytra are shining black. The head is slightly excavated on the forehead and the vertex is shining and impunctate. The thorax is nearly one-third broader at the base than long, the sides rounded, narrowed in front, above subcylindrical, deeply excavated transversely near the base. The surface is impressed here and there with deep distinct punctures, a black stripe on either side closely punctured, subrugose. The scutellum is impunctate, shining red. The elytra is much broader than the thorax, sides parallel, their outer edge armed with fine, distinct serratures, posterior angles produced directly backwards into a stout acute spine. Each elytron has three elevated costae, the outer one less raised than the others, interstices impressed with a double row of deep regular punctures, the third interstice from the suture irregularly punctured along the posterior two-thirds of its course. Beneath shining rufous, the apex of the abdomen piceous.
