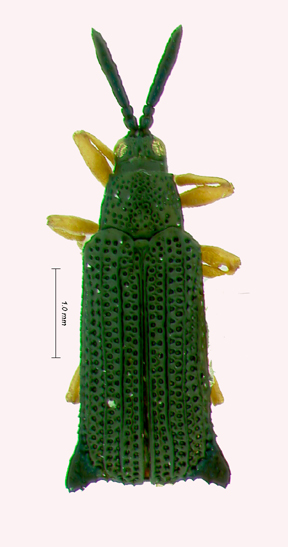

Scientific classification
- Kingdom: Animalia
- Phylum: Arthropoda
- Class: Insecta
- Order: Coleoptera
- Suborder: Polyphaga
- Infraorder: Cucujiformia
- Family: Chrysomelidae
- Genus: Cnestispa
- Species: C. flavipes

Binomial name
- Cnestispa flavipes (Baly, 1885)

Synonyms
- Acanthodes flavipes Baly, 1885

= Cnestispa flavipes =

Species of beetle

Cnestispa flavipes is a species of beetle of the family Chrysomelidae. It is found in Panama.
