= Acanthispa multinotata =

Scientific classification
- Kingdom: Animalia
- Phylum: Arthropoda
- Clade: Pancrustacea
- Class: Insecta
- Order: Coleoptera
- Suborder: Polyphaga
- Infraorder: Cucujiformia
- Family: Chrysomelidae
- Genus: Acanthispa
- Species: A. multinotata

Binomial name
- Acanthispa multinotata (Pic, 1927)

Synonyms
- Acanthodes multinotata Pic, 1927

Species of beetle

Acanthispa multinotata is a species of beetle of the family Chrysomelidae. It is found in Brazil (Goyaz).

== Description ==
Adults reach a length of about 7 mm. Adults are reddish-brown, with black-green markings and black stripes.
