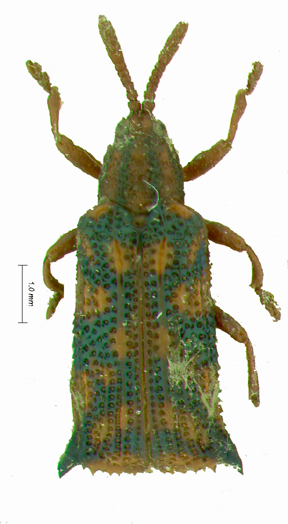

Scientific classification
- Kingdom: Animalia
- Phylum: Arthropoda
- Class: Insecta
- Order: Coleoptera
- Suborder: Polyphaga
- Infraorder: Cucujiformia
- Family: Chrysomelidae
- Genus: Heptachispa
- Species: H. texta

Binomial name
- Heptachispa texta (Uhmann, 1937)

Synonyms
- Heptatoma texta Uhmann, 1937

= Heptachispa texta =

Species of beetle

Heptachispa texta is a species of beetle of the family Chrysomelidae. It is found in Brazil (Goyaz, Minas Gerais, Rio de Janeiro).
