= Cnestispa acuminata =

Scientific classification
- Kingdom: Animalia
- Phylum: Arthropoda
- Class: Insecta
- Order: Coleoptera
- Suborder: Polyphaga
- Infraorder: Cucujiformia
- Family: Chrysomelidae
- Genus: Cnestispa
- Species: C. acuminata

Binomial name
- Cnestispa acuminata Maulik, 1930

Species of beetle

Cnestispa acuminata is a species of beetle of the family Chrysomelidae. It is found in Brazil (Bahia, Para).

== Biology ==
They have been recorded feeding on Cymbosema species.
