= Acanthispa lateralis =

Scientific classification
- Kingdom: Animalia
- Phylum: Arthropoda
- Clade: Pancrustacea
- Class: Insecta
- Order: Coleoptera
- Suborder: Polyphaga
- Infraorder: Cucujiformia
- Family: Chrysomelidae
- Genus: Acanthispa
- Species: A. lateralis

Binomial name
- Acanthispa lateralis Baly, 1864

Species of beetle

Acanthispa lateralis is a species of beetle of the family Chrysomelidae. It is found in Peru.

== Description ==
Adults are black, with a broad vitta on either side of the thorax, and a broad marginal stripe on each elytron, commencing at the base and terminating below the middle, fulvous. The vertex is rugose, deeply grooved down the middle. The antennae are acute, shining blue-black. The thorax is one-third broader at the base than long, narrowed from the base to the apex, the sides indistinctly sinuate, the anterior angles armed with a small obtuse tooth. The scutellum is shining black. The elytra are much broader than the thorax, slightly increasing in width towards their apex, the latter obtusely truncate, the sides narrowly margined, the outer edge coarsely serrate and the apical margin also serrate. The posterior angles are produced into a flattened acute spine, its apex directed obliquely backwards, above subdepressed along the suture. Each elytron has three raised costae, the suture also elevated. The interstices have a double row of deep regular punctures, the third interstice from the suture with three rows, less regularly placed. The underside is black and sternum fulvous.
