= Acanthispa limbata =

Scientific classification
- Kingdom: Animalia
- Phylum: Arthropoda
- Clade: Pancrustacea
- Class: Insecta
- Order: Coleoptera
- Suborder: Polyphaga
- Infraorder: Cucujiformia
- Family: Chrysomelidae
- Genus: Acanthispa
- Species: A. limbata

Binomial name
- Acanthispa limbata Weise, 1904

Species of beetle

Acanthispa limbata is a species of beetle of the family Chrysomelidae. It is found in Peru.
