= Acanthispa rufa =

Scientific classification
- Kingdom: Animalia
- Phylum: Arthropoda
- Clade: Pancrustacea
- Class: Insecta
- Order: Coleoptera
- Suborder: Polyphaga
- Infraorder: Cucujiformia
- Family: Chrysomelidae
- Genus: Acanthispa
- Species: A. rufa

Binomial name
- Acanthispa rufa Pic, 1927

Synonyms
- Acanthodes rana Maulik, 1930

Species of beetle

Acanthispa rufa is a species of beetle of the family Chrysomelidae. It is found in Brazil (Matto Grosso) and Paraguay.

== Description ==
Adults reach a length of about 7 mm. Adults are red, with the elytra unequally lineate, punctate and ribbed.
