= Stethispa conicicollis =

Scientific classification
- Kingdom: Animalia
- Phylum: Arthropoda
- Clade: Pancrustacea
- Class: Insecta
- Order: Coleoptera
- Suborder: Polyphaga
- Infraorder: Cucujiformia
- Family: Chrysomelidae
- Genus: Stethispa
- Species: S. conicicollis

Binomial name
- Stethispa conicicollis Baly, 1864

Species of beetle

Stethispa conicicollis is a species of beetle of the family Chrysomelidae. It is found in French Guiana.

== Description ==
This species may at once be distinguished from the rest of its congeners by the form of the thorax, the sides of which, straight for a very short distance at the base, are then obliquely narrowed to the apex, being but slightly sinuate behind the apex. Its anterior angles are produced into an acute tooth. The surface is depressed and indistinctly excavated transversely behind the middle, rugose-punctate. The centre of the disk in front is nearly impunctate, impressed with the usual longitudinal groove. The base of the epistome is produced into a transverse ridge and the face is furnished, between the insertion of the antennae, with an acute ridge.

== Biology ==
The food plant is unknown.
