= Clinocarispa humeralis =

Scientific classification
- Kingdom: Animalia
- Phylum: Arthropoda
- Class: Insecta
- Order: Coleoptera
- Suborder: Polyphaga
- Infraorder: Cucujiformia
- Family: Chrysomelidae
- Genus: Clinocarispa
- Species: C. humeralis

Binomial name
- Clinocarispa humeralis (Fabricius, 1801)

Synonyms
- Hispa humeralis Fabricius, 1801; Clinocarispa bisbicarinata Uhmann, 1935

Species of beetle

Clinocarispa humeralis is a species of beetle of the family Chrysomelidae. It is found in Brazil (Amapa, Amazonas, Maranhao, Para), French Guiana, Guyana, Suriname and Trinidad.

== Biology ==
They have been recorded feeding on Bambusa vulgaris.
