= Decatelia testaceicollis =

Scientific classification
- Kingdom: Animalia
- Phylum: Arthropoda
- Class: Insecta
- Order: Coleoptera
- Suborder: Polyphaga
- Infraorder: Cucujiformia
- Family: Chrysomelidae
- Genus: Decatelia
- Species: D. testaceicollis

Binomial name
- Decatelia testaceicollis Pic, 1934

Species of beetle

Decatelia testaceicollis is a species of beetle of the family Chrysomelidae. It is found in Brazil.
