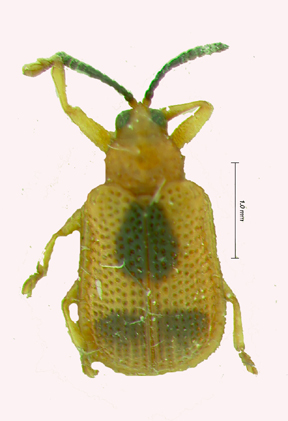

Scientific classification
- Kingdom: Animalia
- Phylum: Arthropoda
- Clade: Pancrustacea
- Class: Insecta
- Order: Coleoptera
- Suborder: Polyphaga
- Infraorder: Cucujiformia
- Family: Chrysomelidae
- Genus: Odontispa
- Species: O. bimaculata

Binomial name
- Odontispa bimaculata Uhmann, 1957

= Odontispa bimaculata =

Species of beetle

Odontispa bimaculata is a species of beetle in the family Chrysomelidae. It is known only from Chapada in Brazil and was described in 1957 by Erich Uhmann.
