= Sternoplispa corumbana =

Scientific classification
- Kingdom: Animalia
- Phylum: Arthropoda
- Class: Insecta
- Order: Coleoptera
- Suborder: Polyphaga
- Infraorder: Cucujiformia
- Family: Chrysomelidae
- Genus: Sternoplispa
- Species: S. corumbana

Binomial name
- Sternoplispa corumbana Uhmann, 1948

Species of beetle

Sternoplispa corumbana is a species of beetle of the family Chrysomelidae. It is found in Brazil (Matto Grosso).

== Biology ==
The food plant is unknown.
