= Acanthispa notaticeps =

Scientific classification
- Kingdom: Animalia
- Phylum: Arthropoda
- Clade: Pancrustacea
- Class: Insecta
- Order: Coleoptera
- Suborder: Polyphaga
- Infraorder: Cucujiformia
- Family: Chrysomelidae
- Genus: Acanthispa
- Species: A. notaticeps

Binomial name
- Acanthispa notaticeps Pic, 1927

Species of beetle

Acanthispa notaticeps is a species of beetle of the family Chrysomelidae. It is found in Bolivia.

== Description ==
Adults reach a length of about 9 mm. Adults are partly red-testaceous, partly testaceous, with black antennae. The elytra has blackish-green markings.
