= Sternoplispa tibialis =

Scientific classification
- Kingdom: Animalia
- Phylum: Arthropoda
- Class: Insecta
- Order: Coleoptera
- Suborder: Polyphaga
- Infraorder: Cucujiformia
- Family: Chrysomelidae
- Genus: Sternoplispa
- Species: S. tibialis

Binomial name
- Sternoplispa tibialis Uhmann, 1948

Species of beetle

Sternoplispa tibialis is a species of beetle of the family Chrysomelidae. It is found in Brazil and Paraguay.

== Biology ==
The food plant is unknown.
