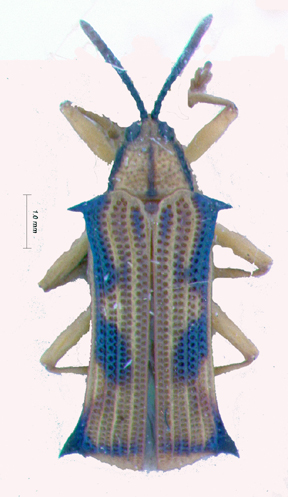

Scientific classification
- Kingdom: Animalia
- Phylum: Arthropoda
- Class: Insecta
- Order: Coleoptera
- Suborder: Polyphaga
- Infraorder: Cucujiformia
- Family: Chrysomelidae
- Genus: Stethispa
- Species: S. bruchi

Binomial name
- Stethispa bruchi Weise, 1906

= Stethispa bruchi =

Species of beetle

Stethispa bruchi is a species of beetle of the family Chrysomelidae. It is found in Argentina.

== Biology ==
The food plant is unknown.
