= Heptachispa flavipes =

Scientific classification
- Kingdom: Animalia
- Phylum: Arthropoda
- Class: Insecta
- Order: Coleoptera
- Suborder: Polyphaga
- Infraorder: Cucujiformia
- Family: Chrysomelidae
- Genus: Heptachispa
- Species: H. flavipes

Binomial name
- Heptachispa flavipes (Weise, 1921)

Synonyms
- Octhispa flavipes Weise, 1921

Species of beetle

Heptachispa flavipes is a species of beetle of the family Chrysomelidae. It is found in Brazil (Amazonas).
