= Acanthispa generosa =

Scientific classification
- Kingdom: Animalia
- Phylum: Arthropoda
- Class: Insecta
- Order: Coleoptera
- Suborder: Polyphaga
- Infraorder: Cucujiformia
- Family: Chrysomelidae
- Genus: Acanthispa
- Species: A. generosa

Binomial name
- Acanthispa generosa Baly, 1864

Species of beetle

Acanthispa generosa is a species of beetle of the family Chrysomelidae. It is found in Brazil (Amazonas).
