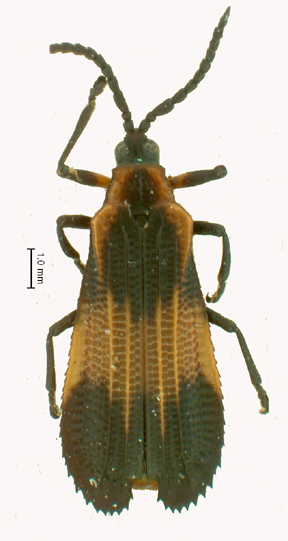

Scientific classification
- Kingdom: Animalia
- Phylum: Arthropoda
- Clade: Pancrustacea
- Class: Insecta
- Order: Coleoptera
- Suborder: Polyphaga
- Infraorder: Cucujiformia
- Family: Chrysomelidae
- Genus: Chalepotatus
- Species: C. antennalis

Binomial name
- Chalepotatus antennalis Weise, 1913

Synonyms
- Chalepotatus longior Pic, 1929

= Chalepotatus antennalis =

Species of beetle

Chalepotatus antennalis is a species of beetle in the family Chrysomelidae. It is found in South America (Brazil, Colombia, Paraguay and Peru).
