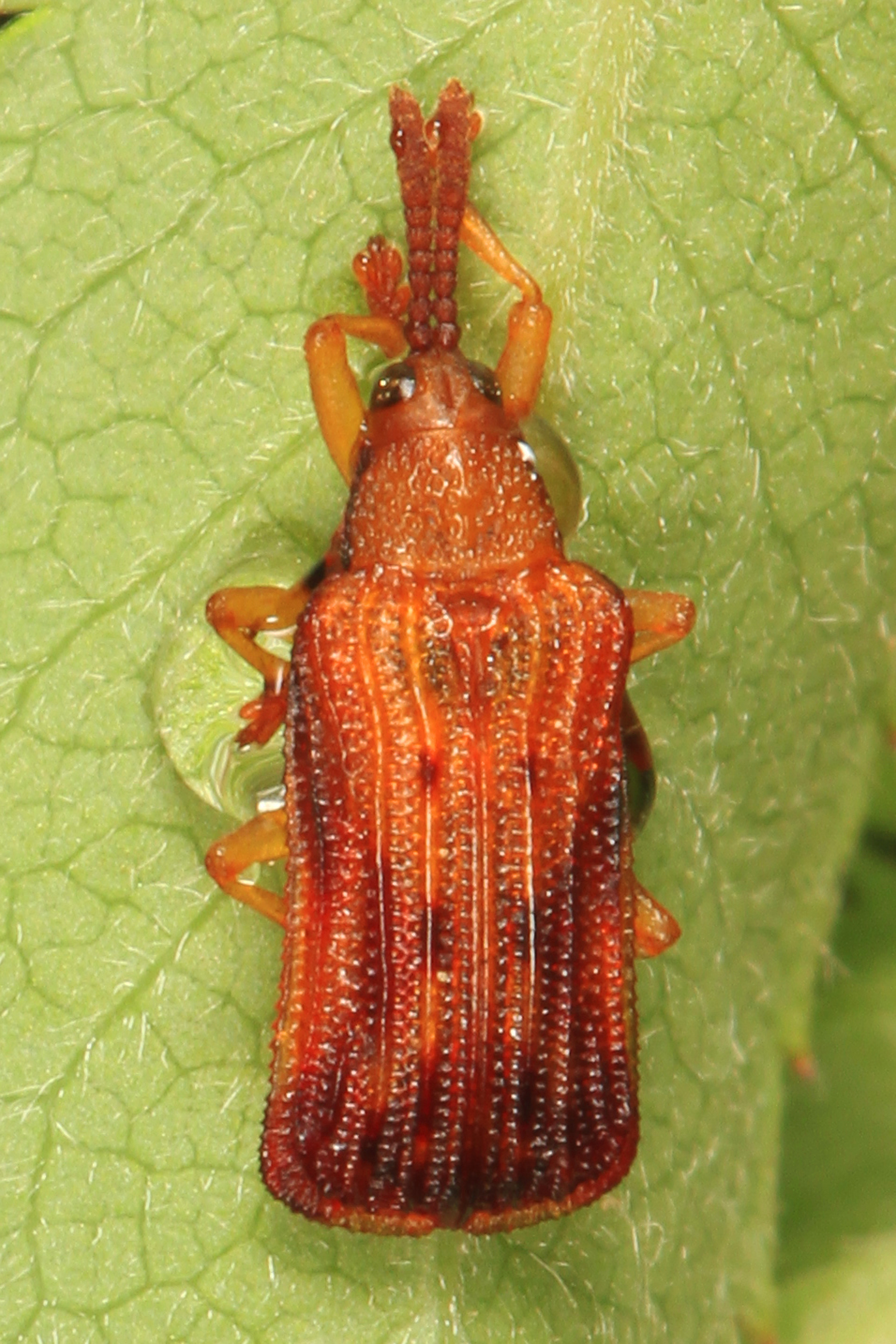
- Baliosus nervosus, adult

Scientific classification
- Kingdom: Animalia
- Phylum: Arthropoda
- Clade: Pancrustacea
- Class: Insecta
- Order: Coleoptera
- Suborder: Polyphaga
- Infraorder: Cucujiformia
- Family: Chrysomelidae
- Subfamily: Cassidinae
- Tribe: Chalepini; Weise, 1910

Synonyms
- Uroplatini Weise, 1910

= Chalepini =

Tribe of beetles

Chalepini is a tribe of leaf beetles in the family Chrysomelidae. There are at least 50 genera and 830 described species in Chalepini.

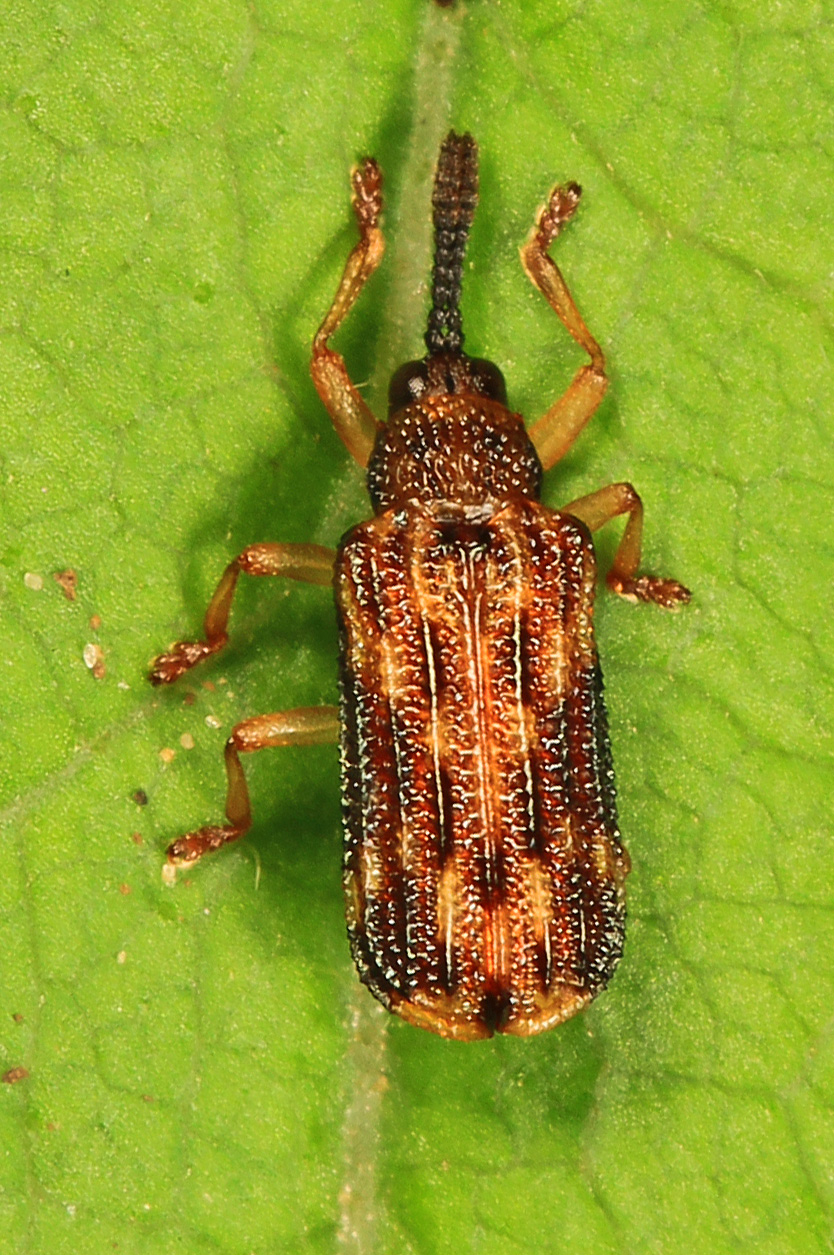
Sumitrosis inaequalis, adult

== Genera ==
- Acanthispa Chapuis, 1875
- Acritispa Uhmann, 1940
- Agathispa Weise, 1905
- Anisochalepus Uhmann, 1940
- Anisostena Weise, 1910
- Baliosus Weise, 1905
- Bicristispa Staines & Zamorano, 2012
- Bothrispa Uhmann, 1940
- Brachycoryna Guérin-Méneville, 1844
- Bruchia Weise, 1906
- Carinispa Uhmann, 1930
- Chalepispa Uhmann, 1955
- Chalepotatus Weise, 1910
- Chalepus Thunberg, 1805
- Charistena Baly, 1864
- Clinocarispa Uhmann, 1935
- Cnestispa Maulik, 1930
- Corynispa Uhmann, 1940
- Craspedonispa Weise, 1910
- Decatelia Weise, 1904
- Euprionota Guérin-Méneville, 1844
- Fossispa Staines, 1989
- Glyphuroplata Uhmann, 1937
- Goyachalepus Pic, 1929
- Heptachispa Uhmann, 1953
- Heptatomispa Uhmann, 1940
- Heptispa Weise, 1906
- Heterispa Chapuis, 1875
- Lycoidispa Ramsey, 2025
- Metazycera Chevrolat in Dejean, 1836
- Microrhopala Chevrolat in Dejean, 1836
- Mimoecthispa Pic, 1927
- Nanocthispa Monrós and Viana, 1947
- Nonispa Maulik, 1933
- Octhispa Chapuis, 1877
- Octotoma Dejean, 1836
- Octuroplata Uhmann, 1940
- Odontispa Uhmann, 1940
- Odontota Chevrolat in Dejean, 1836
- Orbispa Staines & Zamorano, 2012
- Oxychalepus Uhmann, 1937
- Oxyroplata Uhmann, 1940
- Parvispa Uhmann, 1940
- Pentispa Chapuis, 1875
- Physocoryna Guérin-Méneville, 1844
- Platocthispa Uhmann, 1939
- Probaenia Weise, 1904
- Spaethispa Uhmann, 1939
- Stenopodius Horn, 1883
- Sternocthispa Uhmann, 1938
- Sternoplispa Uhmann, 1940
- Sternostena Weise, 1910
- Sternostenoides Monrós and Viana, 1947
- Stethispa Baly, 1864
- Sumitrosis Butte, 1969
- Temnochalepus Uhmann, 1935
- Temnocthispa Uhmann, 1939
- Uroplata Chevrolat in Dejean, 1836
- Xenochalepus Weise, 1910
