= Charistena brevelineata =

Scientific classification
- Kingdom: Animalia
- Phylum: Arthropoda
- Clade: Pancrustacea
- Class: Insecta
- Order: Coleoptera
- Suborder: Polyphaga
- Infraorder: Cucujiformia
- Family: Chrysomelidae
- Genus: Charistena
- Species: C. brevelineata

Binomial name
- Charistena brevelineata Pic, 1927

Species of beetle

Charistena brevelineata is a species of beetle of the family Chrysomelidae. It is found in Brazil.
