= Oxyroplata aequicostata =

Scientific classification
- Kingdom: Animalia
- Phylum: Arthropoda
- Class: Insecta
- Order: Coleoptera
- Suborder: Polyphaga
- Infraorder: Cucujiformia
- Family: Chrysomelidae
- Genus: Oxyroplata
- Species: O. aequicostata

Binomial name
- Oxyroplata aequicostata Uhmann, 1948

Synonyms
- Chalepus (Xenochalepus) trispinosis Pic, 1931

Species of beetle

Oxyroplata aequicostata is a species of beetle of the family Chrysomelidae. It is found in Bolivia.

== Description ==
Adults reach a length of about 8 mm. Their body is black with yellowish-brown areas.
