= Clinocarispa debeauxi =

Scientific classification
- Kingdom: Animalia
- Phylum: Arthropoda
- Clade: Pancrustacea
- Class: Insecta
- Order: Coleoptera
- Suborder: Polyphaga
- Infraorder: Cucujiformia
- Family: Chrysomelidae
- Genus: Clinocarispa
- Species: C. debeauxi

Binomial name
- Clinocarispa debeauxi Uhmann, 1940

Species of beetle

Clinocarispa debeauxi is a species of beetle of the family Chrysomelidae. It is found in Brazil (Amapá, Pará), French Guiana and Suriname.
