= Decatelia costata =

Scientific classification
- Kingdom: Animalia
- Phylum: Arthropoda
- Class: Insecta
- Order: Coleoptera
- Suborder: Polyphaga
- Infraorder: Cucujiformia
- Family: Chrysomelidae
- Genus: Decatelia
- Species: D. costata

Binomial name
- Decatelia costata Pic, 1927

Species of beetle

Decatelia costata is a species of beetle of the family Chrysomelidae. It is found in Bolivia.
