= Euprionota subparallela =

Scientific classification
- Kingdom: Animalia
- Phylum: Arthropoda
- Class: Insecta
- Order: Coleoptera
- Suborder: Polyphaga
- Infraorder: Cucujiformia
- Family: Chrysomelidae
- Genus: Euprionota
- Species: E. subparallela

Binomial name
- Euprionota subparallela (Pic, 1932)

Synonyms
- Penthispa (Euprionota) subparallela Pic, 1932

Species of beetle

Euprionota subparallela is a species of beetle of the family Chrysomelidae. It is found in Mexico (Durango).
