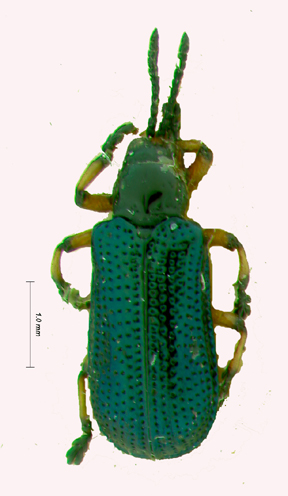

Scientific classification
- Kingdom: Animalia
- Phylum: Arthropoda
- Class: Insecta
- Order: Coleoptera
- Suborder: Polyphaga
- Infraorder: Cucujiformia
- Family: Chrysomelidae
- Genus: Decatelia
- Species: D. lema

Binomial name
- Decatelia lema Weise, 1904

= Decatelia lema =

Species of beetle

Decatelia lema is a species of beetle of the family Chrysomelidae. It is found in Bolivia.
