= Clinocarispa sauveuri =

Scientific classification
- Kingdom: Animalia
- Phylum: Arthropoda
- Clade: Pancrustacea
- Class: Insecta
- Order: Coleoptera
- Suborder: Polyphaga
- Infraorder: Cucujiformia
- Family: Chrysomelidae
- Genus: Clinocarispa
- Species: C. sauveuri

Binomial name
- Clinocarispa sauveuri (Chapuis, 1877)

Synonyms
- Odontota sauveuri Chapuis, 1877; Anoplitis discrepans Weise, 1905; Anoplitis sauveuri funesta Weise, 1910; Anoplitis notaticeps Pic, 1931; Anoplitis thoracalis Uhmann, 1932

Species of beetle

Clinocarispa sauveuri is a species of beetle of the family Chrysomelidae. It is found in Brazil (Amazonas, Bahia, Espírito Santo, Goiás, Minas Gerais, Rio de Janeiro, Santa Catarina, São Paulo, Pernambuco), Colombia and Peru.
