= Stethispa crenatula =

Scientific classification
- Kingdom: Animalia
- Phylum: Arthropoda
- Class: Insecta
- Order: Coleoptera
- Suborder: Polyphaga
- Infraorder: Cucujiformia
- Family: Chrysomelidae
- Genus: Stethispa
- Species: S. crenatula

Binomial name
- Stethispa crenatula Uhmann, 1938

Species of beetle

Stethispa crenatula is a species of beetle of the family Chrysomelidae. It is found in Argentina and Paraguay.

== Biology ==
The recorded food plants are Aristolochia species, Ruprechtia laxifolia and Coccoloba tiliacea.
