= Sternostena varians =

Scientific classification
- Kingdom: Animalia
- Phylum: Arthropoda
- Class: Insecta
- Order: Coleoptera
- Suborder: Polyphaga
- Infraorder: Cucujiformia
- Family: Chrysomelidae
- Genus: Sternostena
- Species: S. varians

Binomial name
- Sternostena varians Weise, 1910

Synonyms
- Sternostena varians apicalis Weise, 1910; Sternostena varians humeralis Weise, 1910

Species of beetle

Sternostena varians is a species of beetle of the family Chrysomelidae. It is found in Argentina, Brazil (Rio de Janeiro), Colombia, Peru, Suriname and Trinidad.

== Biology ==
The food plant is unknown.
