= Acanthispa baeri =

Scientific classification
- Kingdom: Animalia
- Phylum: Arthropoda
- Clade: Pancrustacea
- Class: Insecta
- Order: Coleoptera
- Suborder: Polyphaga
- Infraorder: Cucujiformia
- Family: Chrysomelidae
- Genus: Acanthispa
- Species: A. baeri

Binomial name
- Acanthispa baeri Pic, 1927

Species of beetle

Acanthispa baeri is a species of beetle of the family Chrysomelidae. It is found in Peru.

== Description ==
Adults reach a length of about 6 mm. Adults are black, partly greenish-brown. The elytra are blackish-brown.
