= Acritispa dilatata =

Scientific classification
- Kingdom: Animalia
- Phylum: Arthropoda
- Clade: Pancrustacea
- Class: Insecta
- Order: Coleoptera
- Suborder: Polyphaga
- Infraorder: Cucujiformia
- Family: Chrysomelidae
- Genus: Acritispa
- Species: A. dilatata

Binomial name
- Acritispa dilatata (Uhmann, 1932)

Synonyms
- Physocoryna dilatata Uhmann, 1932

Species of beetle

Acritispa dilatata is a species of beetle of the family Chrysomelidae. It is found in Brazil (Bahia, São Paulo) and Paraguay.
