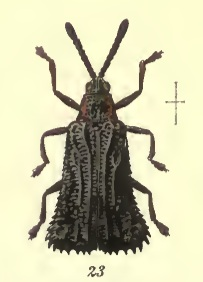

Scientific classification
- Kingdom: Animalia
- Phylum: Arthropoda
- Clade: Pancrustacea
- Class: Insecta
- Order: Coleoptera
- Suborder: Polyphaga
- Infraorder: Cucujiformia
- Family: Chrysomelidae
- Genus: Euprionota
- Species: E. aterrima

Binomial name
- Euprionota aterrima Guérin-Méneville, 1844

= Euprionota aterrima =

Species of beetle

Euprionota aterrima is a species of beetle of the family Chrysomelidae. It is found in Costa Rica, El Salvador, Guatemala, Mexico (Guerrero, Morelos, Oaxaca, Tamaulipas, Veracruz) and Nicaragua.
