= Decatelia pallipes =

Scientific classification
- Kingdom: Animalia
- Phylum: Arthropoda
- Class: Insecta
- Order: Coleoptera
- Suborder: Polyphaga
- Infraorder: Cucujiformia
- Family: Chrysomelidae
- Genus: Decatelia
- Species: D. pallipes

Binomial name
- Decatelia pallipes Weise, 1922

Synonyms
- Paradecatelia viridis Uhmann, 1937; Paradecatelia viridis clarior Uhmann, 1937

Species of beetle

Decatelia pallipes is a species of beetle of the family Chrysomelidae. It is found in Brazil (Minas Gerais, Rio de Janeiro) and Paraguay.

== Biology ==
They have been recorded feeding on Chusquea tenella.
