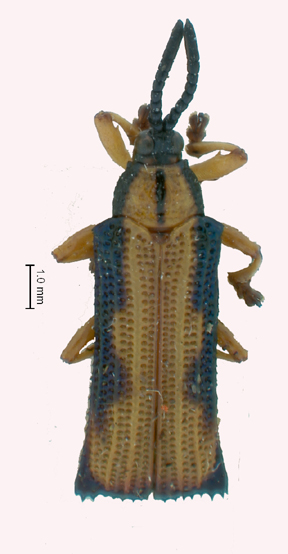

Scientific classification
- Kingdom: Animalia
- Phylum: Arthropoda
- Class: Insecta
- Order: Coleoptera
- Suborder: Polyphaga
- Infraorder: Cucujiformia
- Family: Chrysomelidae
- Genus: Temnocthispa
- Species: T. truncata

Binomial name
- Temnocthispa truncata (Fabricius, 1801)

Synonyms
- Hispa truncata Fabricius, 1801; Uroplata cincta Baly, 1864

= Temnocthispa truncata =

Species of beetle

Temnocthispa truncata is a species of beetle of the family Chrysomelidae. It is found in Brazil (Amazonas) and French Guiana.

== Biology ==
The food plant is unknown.
