= Stethispa rudgeana =

Scientific classification
- Kingdom: Animalia
- Phylum: Arthropoda
- Clade: Pancrustacea
- Class: Insecta
- Order: Coleoptera
- Suborder: Polyphaga
- Infraorder: Cucujiformia
- Family: Chrysomelidae
- Genus: Stethispa
- Species: S. rudgeana

Binomial name
- Stethispa rudgeana Uhmann, 1938

Species of beetle

Stethispa rudgeana is a species of beetle of the family Chrysomelidae. It is found in Brazil (Bahia, Pernambuco).

== Biology ==
The recorded food plant is Coccoloba ilheense.
