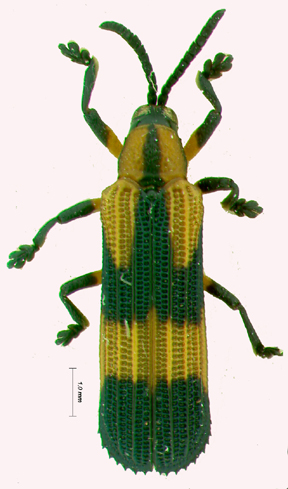

Scientific classification
- Kingdom: Animalia
- Phylum: Arthropoda
- Class: Insecta
- Order: Coleoptera
- Suborder: Polyphaga
- Infraorder: Cucujiformia
- Family: Chrysomelidae
- Genus: Clinocarispa
- Species: C. vinculata

Binomial name
- Clinocarispa vinculata (Weise, 1905)

Synonyms
- Anoplitis vinculata Weise, 1905; Anoplitis sauveuri fasciata Weise, 1910; Clinocarinispa fasciata interrupta Uhmann, 1935; Clinocarinispa fasciata homalina Uhmann, 1935; Clinocarinispa fasciata weisei Uhmann, 1935; Clinocarinispa fasciata zikani Uhmann, 1935; Anoplitis fasciatipennis Pic, 1932

= Clinocarispa vinculata =

Species of beetle

Clinocarispa vinculata is a species of beetle of the family Chrysomelidae. It is found in Bolivia, Brazil (Amapa, Amazonas, Bahia, Goyaz, Matto Grosso, Para), Colombia, Paraguay, Peru and Suriname.
