= Stethispa bonvouloirii =

Scientific classification
- Kingdom: Animalia
- Phylum: Arthropoda
- Clade: Pancrustacea
- Class: Insecta
- Order: Coleoptera
- Suborder: Polyphaga
- Infraorder: Cucujiformia
- Family: Chrysomelidae
- Genus: Stethispa
- Species: S. bonvouloirii

Binomial name
- Stethispa bonvouloirii Baly, 1864

Species of beetle

Stethispa bonvouloirii is a species of beetle of the family Chrysomelidae. It is found in Brazil and Peru.

== Description ==
The thorax is nearly twice as broad as long, the sides nearly straight and parallel at their base, rounded and slightly narrowed in the middle, narrowed and sinuate in front. The anterior angles armed with an obtuse, the hinder with an acute, tooth. The disk is convex in front, flattened behind the middle, surface impressed with large deep punctures, which, crowded at the base, become subremote on the sides, and still more distant on the anterior half of the disk. The lateral border bounded within by a single row of deep punctures and the medial line is impressed with a longitudinal groove, which extends from just behind the apical nearly to the basal margin.

== Biology ==
The food plant is unknown.
