= Bruchia sparsa =

Scientific classification
- Kingdom: Animalia
- Phylum: Arthropoda
- Clade: Pancrustacea
- Class: Insecta
- Order: Coleoptera
- Suborder: Polyphaga
- Infraorder: Cucujiformia
- Family: Chrysomelidae
- Genus: Bruchia
- Species: B. sparsa

Binomial name
- Bruchia sparsa Weise, 1906

Species of beetle

Bruchia sparsa is a species of beetle in the family Chrysomelidae. It is found in Argentina (Buenos Aires), Brazil (Minas Gerais, São Paulo) and Ecuador.
