= Euprionota bruchi =

Scientific classification
- Kingdom: Animalia
- Phylum: Arthropoda
- Class: Insecta
- Order: Coleoptera
- Suborder: Polyphaga
- Infraorder: Cucujiformia
- Family: Chrysomelidae
- Genus: Euprionota
- Species: E. bruchi

Binomial name
- Euprionota bruchi (Uhmann, 1930)

Synonyms
- Penthispa (Euprionota) bruchi Uhmann, 1930

Species of beetle

Euprionota bruchi is a species of beetle of the family Chrysomelidae. It is found in Costa Rica.
