= Charistena brasiliensis =

Scientific classification
- Kingdom: Animalia
- Phylum: Arthropoda
- Clade: Pancrustacea
- Class: Insecta
- Order: Coleoptera
- Suborder: Polyphaga
- Infraorder: Cucujiformia
- Family: Chrysomelidae
- Genus: Charistena
- Species: C. brasiliensis

Binomial name
- Charistena brasiliensis Pic, 1927

Species of beetle

Charistena brasiliensis is a species of beetle of the family Chrysomelidae. It is found in Brazil.
