= Heptachispa delkeskampi =

Scientific classification
- Kingdom: Animalia
- Phylum: Arthropoda
- Class: Insecta
- Order: Coleoptera
- Suborder: Polyphaga
- Infraorder: Cucujiformia
- Family: Chrysomelidae
- Genus: Heptachispa
- Species: H. delkeskampi

Binomial name
- Heptachispa delkeskampi (Uhmann, 1940)

Synonyms
- Heptatoma delkeskampi Uhmann, 1940

Species of beetle

Heptachispa delkeskampi is a species of beetle of the family Chrysomelidae. It is found in Brazil (Amazonas, Matto Grosso, São Paulo) and Paraguay.
