= Oxyroplata soror =

Scientific classification
- Kingdom: Animalia
- Phylum: Arthropoda
- Class: Insecta
- Order: Coleoptera
- Suborder: Polyphaga
- Infraorder: Cucujiformia
- Family: Chrysomelidae
- Genus: Oxyroplata
- Species: O. soror

Binomial name
- Oxyroplata soror (Weise, 1905)

Synonyms
- Uroplata soror Weise, 1905

Species of beetle

Oxyroplata soror is a species of beetle of the family Chrysomelidae. It is found in Peru.

== Description ==
Adults reach a length of about 8 mm. Adults are black, while the elytron is yellow.
