= Heptachispa crassicornis =

Scientific classification
- Kingdom: Animalia
- Phylum: Arthropoda
- Class: Insecta
- Order: Coleoptera
- Suborder: Polyphaga
- Infraorder: Cucujiformia
- Family: Chrysomelidae
- Genus: Heptachispa
- Species: H. crassicornis

Binomial name
- Heptachispa crassicornis (Chapuis, 1877)

Synonyms
- Uroplata (Uroplata) crassicornis Chapuis, 1877

Species of beetle

Heptachispa crassicornis is a species of beetle of the family Chrysomelidae. It is found in Brazil (Goyaz, São Paulo).
