= Acanthispa =

Scientific classification
- Kingdom: Animalia
- Phylum: Arthropoda
- Clade: Pancrustacea
- Class: Insecta
- Order: Coleoptera
- Suborder: Polyphaga
- Infraorder: Cucujiformia
- Family: Chrysomelidae
- Subfamily: Cassidinae
- Tribe: Chalepini
- Genus: Acanthispa; Chapuis, 1875

Synonyms
- Acanthodes Baly, 1864 (not Agassiz, 1833)

Genus of leaf beetles

Acanthispa is a genus of beetles belonging to the family Chrysomelidae.

== Species ==
- Acanthispa baeri Pic, 1927
- Acanthispa bihamata (Linnaeus, 1767)
- Acanthispa diversicornis Pic, 1927
- Acanthispa donckieri Weise, 1904
- Acanthispa generosa Baly, 1864
- Acanthispa lateralis Baly, 1864
- Acanthispa limbata Weise, 1904
- Acanthispa multinotata Pic, 1927
- Acanthispa nigripennis Baly, 1864
- Acanthispa notaticeps Pic, 1927
- Acanthispa rufa Pic, 1927
- Acanthispa strandi Uhmann, 1933
- Acanthispa tarsata Baly, 1864
- Acanthispa unca Spaeth, 1937
- Acanthispa viridipennis Weise, 1904
