= Acanthispa unca =

Scientific classification
- Kingdom: Animalia
- Phylum: Arthropoda
- Clade: Pancrustacea
- Class: Insecta
- Order: Coleoptera
- Suborder: Polyphaga
- Infraorder: Cucujiformia
- Family: Chrysomelidae
- Genus: Acanthispa
- Species: A. unca

Binomial name
- Acanthispa unca Spaeth, 1937

Species of beetle

Acanthispa unca is a species of beetle of the family Chrysomelidae. It is found in Argentina and Paraguay.
