= Charistena bergi =

Scientific classification
- Kingdom: Animalia
- Phylum: Arthropoda
- Clade: Pancrustacea
- Class: Insecta
- Order: Coleoptera
- Suborder: Polyphaga
- Infraorder: Cucujiformia
- Family: Chrysomelidae
- Genus: Charistena
- Species: C. bergi

Binomial name
- Charistena bergi (Duvivier, 1890)

Synonyms
- Anisostena bergi Duvivier, 1890; Charistena laticollis Pic, 1927

Species of beetle

Charistena bergi is a species of beetle of the family Chrysomelidae. It is found in Argentina, Bolivia, French Guiana and Paraguay.

== Biology ==
They have been recorded feeding on Panicum grumosum.
