= Clinocarispa transversa =

Scientific classification
- Kingdom: Animalia
- Phylum: Arthropoda
- Class: Insecta
- Order: Coleoptera
- Suborder: Polyphaga
- Infraorder: Cucujiformia
- Family: Chrysomelidae
- Genus: Clinocarispa
- Species: C. transversa

Binomial name
- Clinocarispa transversa Uhmann, 1963

Species of beetle

Clinocarispa transversa is a species of beetle of the family Chrysomelidae. It is found in Brazil (Amazonas).
