= Heptachispa pallipes =

Scientific classification
- Kingdom: Animalia
- Phylum: Arthropoda
- Class: Insecta
- Order: Coleoptera
- Suborder: Polyphaga
- Infraorder: Cucujiformia
- Family: Chrysomelidae
- Genus: Heptachispa
- Species: H. pallipes

Binomial name
- Heptachispa pallipes (Chapuis, 1877)

Synonyms
- Uroplata (Uroplata) pallipes Chapuis, 1877

Species of beetle

Heptachispa pallipes is a species of beetle of the family Chrysomelidae. It is found in Bolivia and Brazil.

== Biology ==
They have been recorded feeding on Byrsonima species.
