= Craspedonispa modesta =

Scientific classification
- Kingdom: Animalia
- Phylum: Arthropoda
- Class: Insecta
- Order: Coleoptera
- Suborder: Polyphaga
- Infraorder: Cucujiformia
- Family: Chrysomelidae
- Genus: Craspedonispa
- Species: C. modesta

Binomial name
- Craspedonispa modesta Weise, 1910

Species of beetle

Craspedonispa modesta is a species of beetle of the family Chrysomelidae. It is found in Brazil.
