= Cnestispa darwini =

Scientific classification
- Kingdom: Animalia
- Phylum: Arthropoda
- Clade: Pancrustacea
- Class: Insecta
- Order: Coleoptera
- Suborder: Polyphaga
- Infraorder: Cucujiformia
- Family: Chrysomelidae
- Genus: Cnestispa
- Species: C. darwini

Binomial name
- Cnestispa darwini Maulik, 1930

Species of beetle

Cnestispa darwini is a species of beetle of the family Chrysomelidae. It is found in Argentina and Brazil (Bahia, Para, Pernambuco).

== Biology ==
They have been recorded feeding on Cymbosema species, Desmodium discolor and Centrosema pubescens.
