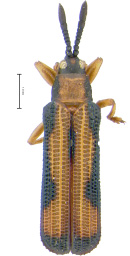

Scientific classification
- Kingdom: Animalia
- Phylum: Arthropoda
- Clade: Pancrustacea
- Class: Insecta
- Order: Coleoptera
- Suborder: Polyphaga
- Infraorder: Cucujiformia
- Family: Chrysomelidae
- Subfamily: Cassidinae
- Tribe: Chalepini
- Genus: Orbispa; Staines & Zamorano, 2012
- Species: O. confluens

Binomial name
- Orbispa confluens Staines & Zamorano, 2012

= Orbispa =

Genus of beetles

Orbispa is a genus of leaf beetles in the family Chrysomelidae. It is monotypic, being represented by the single species, Orbispa confluens, which is found in Ecuador.

== Biology ==
They have been recorded feeding on Trattinnickia rhofolia.
