= Sternostena triangularis =

Scientific classification
- Kingdom: Animalia
- Phylum: Arthropoda
- Class: Insecta
- Order: Coleoptera
- Suborder: Polyphaga
- Infraorder: Cucujiformia
- Family: Chrysomelidae
- Genus: Sternostena
- Species: S. triangularis

Binomial name
- Sternostena triangularis Uhmann, 1931

Species of beetle

Sternostena triangularis is a species of beetle of the family Chrysomelidae. It is found in Brazil (São Paulo).

== Biology ==
The food plant is unknown.
