= Heptachispa sordidula =

Scientific classification
- Kingdom: Animalia
- Phylum: Arthropoda
- Class: Insecta
- Order: Coleoptera
- Suborder: Polyphaga
- Infraorder: Cucujiformia
- Family: Chrysomelidae
- Genus: Heptachispa
- Species: H. sordidula

Binomial name
- Heptachispa sordidula (Weise, 1913)

Synonyms
- Uroplata sordidula Weise, 1913

Species of beetle

Heptachispa sordidula is a species of beetle of the family Chrysomelidae. It is found in Paraguay and Brazil.
