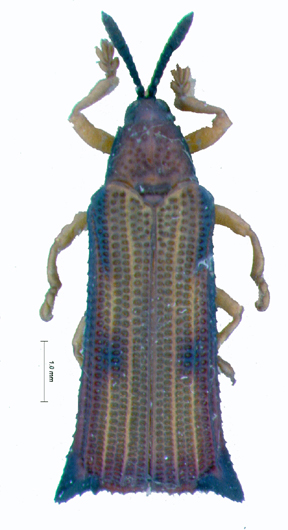

Scientific classification
- Kingdom: Animalia
- Phylum: Arthropoda
- Class: Insecta
- Order: Coleoptera
- Suborder: Polyphaga
- Infraorder: Cucujiformia
- Family: Chrysomelidae
- Genus: Sternoplispa
- Species: S. nigrohumeralis

Binomial name
- Sternoplispa nigrohumeralis (Pic, 1927)

Synonyms
- Oethispa nigrohumeralis Pic, 1927

= Sternoplispa nigrohumeralis =

Species of beetle

Sternoplispa nigrohumeralis is a species of beetle of the family Chrysomelidae. It is found in Brazil (Goiás) and Paraguay.

== Description ==
Adults reach a length of about 7–8 mm. Adults are reddish-brown, with black antennae and the thorax laterally streaked with black. The elytra are partly marked with black.

== Biology ==
The food plant is unknown.
