= Sternoplispa triformis =

Scientific classification
- Kingdom: Animalia
- Phylum: Arthropoda
- Class: Insecta
- Order: Coleoptera
- Suborder: Polyphaga
- Infraorder: Cucujiformia
- Family: Chrysomelidae
- Genus: Sternoplispa
- Species: S. triformis

Binomial name
- Sternoplispa triformis Uhmann, 1935

Species of beetle

Sternoplispa triformis is a species of beetle of the family Chrysomelidae. It is found in Argentina, Brazil and Paraguay.

== Biology ==
The food plant is unknown.
