= Acanthispa bihamata =

Scientific classification
- Kingdom: Animalia
- Phylum: Arthropoda
- Clade: Pancrustacea
- Class: Insecta
- Order: Coleoptera
- Suborder: Polyphaga
- Infraorder: Cucujiformia
- Family: Chrysomelidae
- Genus: Acanthispa
- Species: A. bihamata

Binomial name
- Acanthispa bihamata (Linnaeus, 1767)

Synonyms
- Hispa bihamata Linnaeus, 1767; Hispa (Uroplata) leseleuei Guérin-Méneville, 1844; Acanthodes hebe Baly, 1864

Species of beetle

Acanthispa bihamata is a species of beetle of the family Chrysomelidae. It is found in Brazil (Matto Grosso), French Guiana and Suriname.
