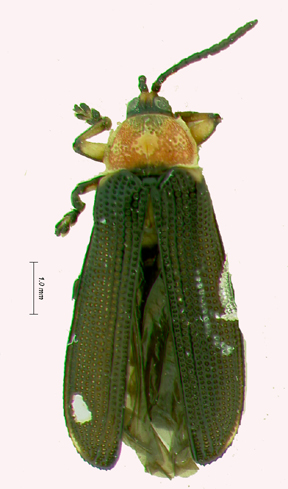

Scientific classification
- Kingdom: Animalia
- Phylum: Arthropoda
- Class: Insecta
- Order: Coleoptera
- Suborder: Polyphaga
- Infraorder: Cucujiformia
- Family: Chrysomelidae
- Genus: Craspedonispa
- Species: C. saccharina

Binomial name
- Craspedonispa saccharina Maulik, 1930

= Craspedonispa saccharina =

Species of beetle

Craspedonispa saccharina is a species of beetle of the family Chrysomelidae. It is found in Trinidad.

== Biology ==
They have been recorded feeding on Saccharum officinarum.
