= Cnestispa reimoseri =

Scientific classification
- Kingdom: Animalia
- Phylum: Arthropoda
- Class: Insecta
- Order: Coleoptera
- Suborder: Polyphaga
- Infraorder: Cucujiformia
- Family: Chrysomelidae
- Genus: Cnestispa
- Species: C. reimoseri

Binomial name
- Cnestispa reimoseri (Spaeth, 1937)

Synonyms
- Acanthodes (Cnestispa) reimoseri Spaeth, 1937

Species of beetle

Cnestispa reimoseri is a species of beetle of the family Chrysomelidae. It is found in Paraguay.
