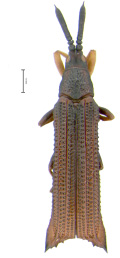

Scientific classification
- Kingdom: Animalia
- Phylum: Arthropoda
- Clade: Pancrustacea
- Class: Insecta
- Order: Coleoptera
- Suborder: Polyphaga
- Infraorder: Cucujiformia
- Family: Chrysomelidae
- Subfamily: Cassidinae
- Tribe: Chalepini
- Genus: Bicristispa; Staines & Zamorano, 2012
- Species: B. gracilis

Binomial name
- Bicristispa gracilis Staines & Zamorano, 2012

= Bicristispa =

Genus of beetles

Bicristispa is a genus of leaf beetles in the family Chrysomelidae. It is monotypic, being represented by the single species, Bicristispa gracilis, which is found in Ecuador.

== Biology ==
This species has been found feeding on Iriartea deltoidea.
