= Chalepotatus integer =

Scientific classification
- Kingdom: Animalia
- Phylum: Arthropoda
- Class: Insecta
- Order: Coleoptera
- Suborder: Polyphaga
- Infraorder: Cucujiformia
- Family: Chrysomelidae
- Genus: Chalepotatus
- Species: C. integer

Binomial name
- Chalepotatus integer Uhmann, 1935

Species of beetle

Chalepotatus integer is a species of beetle of the family Chrysomelidae. It is found in Brazil (Minas Gerais).
