= Charistena minima =

Scientific classification
- Kingdom: Animalia
- Phylum: Arthropoda
- Clade: Pancrustacea
- Class: Insecta
- Order: Coleoptera
- Suborder: Polyphaga
- Infraorder: Cucujiformia
- Family: Chrysomelidae
- Genus: Charistena
- Species: C. minima

Binomial name
- Charistena minima Pic, 1934

Species of beetle

Charistena minima is a species of beetle of the family Chrysomelidae. It is found in Mexico.
