= Clinocarispa subhomalina =

Scientific classification
- Kingdom: Animalia
- Phylum: Arthropoda
- Clade: Pancrustacea
- Class: Insecta
- Order: Coleoptera
- Suborder: Polyphaga
- Infraorder: Cucujiformia
- Family: Chrysomelidae
- Genus: Clinocarispa
- Species: C. subhomalina

Binomial name
- Clinocarispa subhomalina Uhmann, 1938

Species of beetle

Clinocarispa subhomalina is a species of beetle of the family Chrysomelidae. It is found in Brazil (Amazonas, Pernambuco, Rondônia) and Suriname.
