= Sternostena laeta =

Scientific classification
- Kingdom: Animalia
- Phylum: Arthropoda
- Class: Insecta
- Order: Coleoptera
- Suborder: Polyphaga
- Infraorder: Cucujiformia
- Family: Chrysomelidae
- Genus: Sternostena
- Species: S. laeta

Binomial name
- Sternostena laeta Weise, 1910

Synonyms
- Sternostena laeta uhmanni Monrós & Viana, 1947

Species of beetle

Sternostena laeta is a species of beetle of the family Chrysomelidae. It is found in Argentina, Paraguay and Peru.

== Biology ==
The recorded food plants are grasses, including Paspalum quadrifarum.
