= Bruchia fulvipes =

Scientific classification
- Kingdom: Animalia
- Phylum: Arthropoda
- Clade: Pancrustacea
- Class: Insecta
- Order: Coleoptera
- Suborder: Polyphaga
- Infraorder: Cucujiformia
- Family: Chrysomelidae
- Genus: Bruchia
- Species: B. fulvipes

Binomial name
- Bruchia fulvipes (Baly, 1885)

Synonyms
- Brachycoryna fulvipes Baly, 1885

Species of beetle

Bruchia fulvipes is a species of beetle in the family Chrysomelidae. It is found in Colombia, Costa Rica and Panama.
