= Heptachispa vitticollis =

Scientific classification
- Kingdom: Animalia
- Phylum: Arthropoda
- Class: Insecta
- Order: Coleoptera
- Suborder: Polyphaga
- Infraorder: Cucujiformia
- Family: Chrysomelidae
- Genus: Heptachispa
- Species: H. vitticollis

Binomial name
- Heptachispa vitticollis (Weise, 1911)

Synonyms
- Octhispa vitticollis Weise, 1911

Species of beetle

Heptachispa vitticollis is a species of beetle of the family Chrysomelidae. It is found in Bolivia and Brazil (Bahia).
