= Stethispa lineata =

Scientific classification
- Kingdom: Animalia
- Phylum: Arthropoda
- Class: Insecta
- Order: Coleoptera
- Suborder: Polyphaga
- Infraorder: Cucujiformia
- Family: Chrysomelidae
- Genus: Stethispa
- Species: S. lineata

Binomial name
- Stethispa lineata Uhmann, 1935

Species of beetle

Stethispa lineata is a species of beetle of the family Chrysomelidae. It is found in Brazil (Amazonas), French Guiana and Suriname.

== Biology ==
The food plant is unknown.
