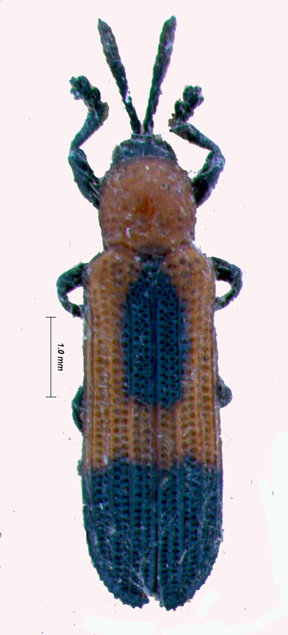

Scientific classification
- Kingdom: Animalia
- Phylum: Arthropoda
- Clade: Pancrustacea
- Class: Insecta
- Order: Coleoptera
- Suborder: Polyphaga
- Infraorder: Cucujiformia
- Family: Chrysomelidae
- Genus: Sternostena
- Species: S. basalis

Binomial name
- Sternostena basalis (Baly, 1864)

Synonyms
- Charistena basalis Baly, 1864; Sternostena basalis laterubra Pic, 1932; Sternostena basalis signata Weise, 1910

= Sternostena basalis =

Species of beetle

Sternostena basalis is a species of beetle of the family Chrysomelidae. It is found in Argentina and Brazil (Amazonas, Goiás, Pernambuco).

== Biology ==
The food plant is unknown.
