= Acritispa germaini =

Scientific classification
- Kingdom: Animalia
- Phylum: Arthropoda
- Clade: Pancrustacea
- Class: Insecta
- Order: Coleoptera
- Suborder: Polyphaga
- Infraorder: Cucujiformia
- Family: Chrysomelidae
- Genus: Acritispa
- Species: A. germaini

Binomial name
- Acritispa germaini (Pic, 1925)

Synonyms
- Octotoma germaini Pic, 1925

Species of beetle

Acritispa germaini is a species of beetle of the family Chrysomelidae. It is found in Bolivia and Panama.
