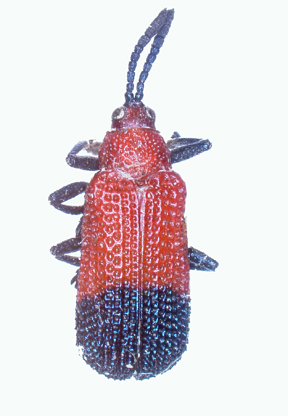

Scientific classification
- Kingdom: Animalia
- Phylum: Arthropoda
- Clade: Pancrustacea
- Class: Insecta
- Order: Coleoptera
- Suborder: Polyphaga
- Infraorder: Cucujiformia
- Family: Chrysomelidae
- Subfamily: Cassidinae
- Tribe: Chalepini
- Genus: Spaethispa; Uhmann, 1940
- Species: S. pulchella

Binomial name
- Spaethispa pulchella (Suffrian, 1868)

Synonyms
- Uroplata pulchella Suffrian, 1868

= Spaethispa =

Genus of beetles

Spaethispa is a genus of leaf beetles in the family Chrysomelidae. It is monotypic, being represented by the single species, Spaethispa pulchella, which is found in Cuba.

== Biology ==
The recorded food plant is Malpighia punicifolia.
