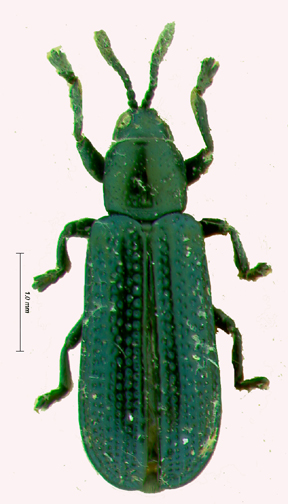

Scientific classification
- Kingdom: Animalia
- Phylum: Arthropoda
- Clade: Pancrustacea
- Class: Insecta
- Order: Coleoptera
- Suborder: Polyphaga
- Infraorder: Cucujiformia
- Family: Chrysomelidae
- Subfamily: Cassidinae
- Tribe: Chalepini
- Genus: Nonispa; Maulik, 1933
- Species: N. carlosbruchi

Binomial name
- Nonispa carlosbruchi Maulik, 1933

Synonyms
- Enneachalepus Spaeth, 1934; Enneachalepus aeruginosa Spaeth, 1934

= Nonispa =

Genus of beetles

Nonispa is a genus of leaf beetles in the family Chrysomelidae. It is monotypic, being represented by the single species, Nonispa carlosbruchi, which is found in Argentina and Bolivia.

== Biology ==
They have been recorded feeding on Paspalum species and Panicum grumosum.
