= Sternoplispa =

Scientific classification
- Kingdom: Animalia
- Phylum: Arthropoda
- Clade: Pancrustacea
- Class: Insecta
- Order: Coleoptera
- Suborder: Polyphaga
- Infraorder: Cucujiformia
- Family: Chrysomelidae
- Subfamily: Cassidinae
- Tribe: Chalepini
- Genus: Sternoplispa; Uhmann, 1940

Genus of leaf beetles

Sternoplispa is a genus of beetles belonging to the family Chrysomelidae.

== Species ==
- Sternoplispa brunnea Uhmann, 1948
- Sternoplispa corumbana Uhmann, 1948
- Sternoplispa nigrohumeralis (Pic, 1927)
- Sternoplispa opacicollis (Uhmann, 1935)
- Sternoplispa rotundata Uhmann, 1948
- Sternoplispa tibialis Uhmann, 1948
- Sternoplispa triformis Uhmann, 1935
