= Acritispa =

Scientific classification
- Kingdom: Animalia
- Phylum: Arthropoda
- Clade: Pancrustacea
- Class: Insecta
- Order: Coleoptera
- Suborder: Polyphaga
- Infraorder: Cucujiformia
- Family: Chrysomelidae
- Subfamily: Cassidinae
- Tribe: Chalepini
- Genus: Acritispa; Uhmann, 1940

Genus of leaf beetles

Acritispa is a genus of beetles belonging to the family Chrysomelidae.

== Species ==
- Acritispa dilatata (Uhmann, 1932)
- Acritispa germaini (Pic, 1925)
