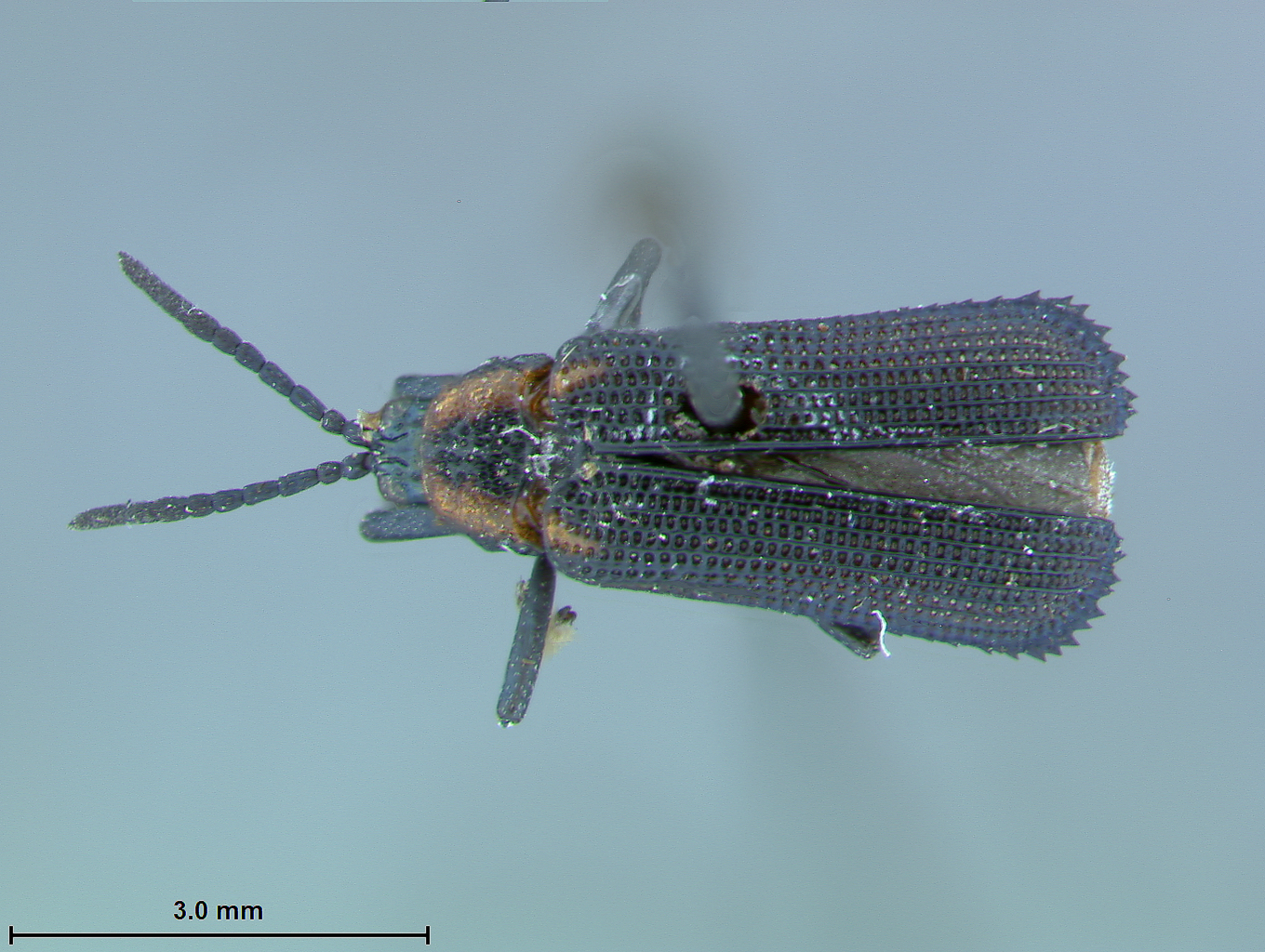

Scientific classification
- Kingdom: Animalia
- Phylum: Arthropoda
- Clade: Pancrustacea
- Class: Insecta
- Order: Coleoptera
- Suborder: Polyphaga
- Infraorder: Cucujiformia
- Family: Chrysomelidae
- Subfamily: Cassidinae
- Tribe: Chalepini
- Genus: Carinispa; Uhmann, 1930
- Species: C. nevermanni

Binomial name
- Carinispa nevermanni Uhmann, 1930

= Carinispa =

Genus of beetles

Carinispa is a leaf beetle genus of the tribe Chalepini with one known species, Carinispa nevermanni. It is found in Central America.

== Biology ==
They have been recorded feeding on Malpighia glabra, Sida cordifolia and Bunchosia species.
