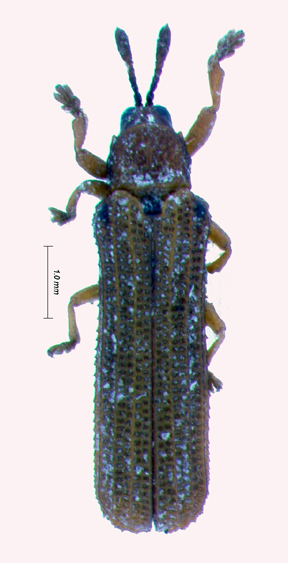

Scientific classification
- Kingdom: Animalia
- Phylum: Arthropoda
- Clade: Pancrustacea
- Class: Insecta
- Order: Coleoptera
- Suborder: Polyphaga
- Infraorder: Cucujiformia
- Family: Chrysomelidae
- Subfamily: Cassidinae
- Tribe: Chalepini
- Genus: Sternocthispa; Uhmann, 1938
- Species: S. gracillima

Binomial name
- Sternocthispa gracillima Uhmann, 1938

= Sternocthispa =

Genus of beetles

Sternocthispa is a genus of leaf beetles in the family Chrysomelidae. It is monotypic, being represented by the single species, Sternocthispa gracillima, which is found in Brazil.

== Biology ==
The food plant is unknown.
