= Odontispa =

Scientific classification
- Kingdom: Animalia
- Phylum: Arthropoda
- Clade: Pancrustacea
- Class: Insecta
- Order: Coleoptera
- Suborder: Polyphaga
- Infraorder: Cucujiformia
- Family: Chrysomelidae
- Subfamily: Cassidinae
- Tribe: Chalepini
- Genus: Odontispa; Uhmann, 1940

Type species
- Prosopodonta latipennis Pic, 1928

Genus of leaf beetles

Odontispa is a genus of beetles in the family Chrysomelidae. It was erected as a monospecific genus in 1940 by Erich Uhmann, with Prosopodonta latipennis as the type and sole species, and is placed within the tribe Chalepini. Two species are known, both from Brazil.

== Species ==
This genus includes the following species:

- Odontispa bimaculata Uhmann, 1957
- Odontispa latipennis (Pic, 1928)
