= Oxyroplata =

Scientific classification
- Kingdom: Animalia
- Phylum: Arthropoda
- Clade: Pancrustacea
- Class: Insecta
- Order: Coleoptera
- Suborder: Polyphaga
- Infraorder: Cucujiformia
- Family: Chrysomelidae
- Subfamily: Cassidinae
- Tribe: Chalepini
- Genus: Oxyroplata; Uhmann, 1940

Genus of leaf beetles

Oxyroplata is a genus of beetles belonging to the family Chrysomelidae.

== Species ==
- Oxyroplata aequicostata Uhmann, 1948
- Oxyroplata bellicosa (Baly, 1885)
- Oxyroplata clienta (Weise, 1905)
- Oxyroplata soror (Weise, 1905)
