= Cnestispa =

Scientific classification
- Kingdom: Animalia
- Phylum: Arthropoda
- Clade: Pancrustacea
- Class: Insecta
- Order: Coleoptera
- Suborder: Polyphaga
- Infraorder: Cucujiformia
- Family: Chrysomelidae
- Subfamily: Cassidinae
- Tribe: Chalepini
- Genus: Cnestispa; Maulik, 1930

Genus of leaf beetles

Cnestispa is a genus of beetles belonging to the family Chrysomelidae.

== Species ==
- Cnestispa acuminata Maulik, 1930
- Cnestispa darwini Maulik, 1930
- Cnestispa flavipes (Baly, 1885)
- Cnestispa reimoseri (Spaeth, 1937)
