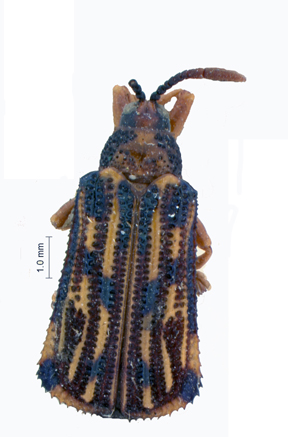

Scientific classification
- Kingdom: Animalia
- Phylum: Arthropoda
- Clade: Pancrustacea
- Class: Insecta
- Order: Coleoptera
- Suborder: Polyphaga
- Infraorder: Cucujiformia
- Family: Chrysomelidae
- Subfamily: Cassidinae
- Tribe: Chalepini
- Genus: Mimoecthispa; Pic, 1927
- Species: M. irregularis

Binomial name
- Mimoecthispa irregularis Pic, 1927

= Mimoecthispa =

Genus of beetles

Mimoethispa is a genus of leaf beetles in the family Chrysomelidae. It is monotypic, being represented by the single species, Mimoecthispa irregularis, which is found in Brazil (Rio Grande do Sul).

== Description ==
Adults reach a length of about 9 mm. Adults are reddish-testaceos, with yellow and metallic markings on the elytra.
