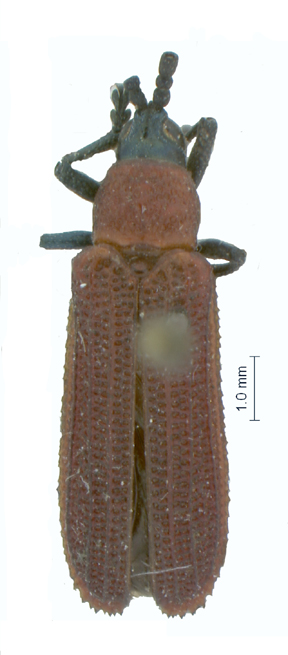

Scientific classification
- Kingdom: Animalia
- Phylum: Arthropoda
- Clade: Pancrustacea
- Class: Insecta
- Order: Coleoptera
- Suborder: Polyphaga
- Infraorder: Cucujiformia
- Family: Chrysomelidae
- Subfamily: Cassidinae
- Tribe: Chalepini
- Genus: Anisochalepus; Uhmann, 1940
- Species: A. reimoseri

Binomial name
- Anisochalepus reimoseri Uhmann, 1940

= Anisochalepus =

Genus of beetles

Anisochalepus is a genus of leaf beetles in the family Chrysomelidae. It is monotypic, being represented by the single species, Anisochalepus reimoseri, which is found in Paraguay.
