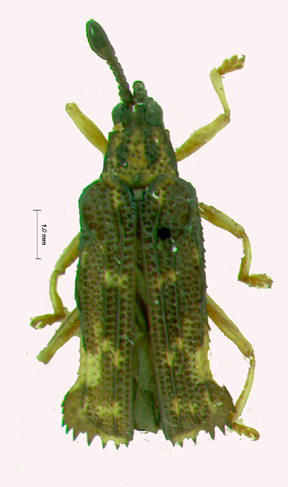

Scientific classification
- Kingdom: Animalia
- Phylum: Arthropoda
- Clade: Pancrustacea
- Class: Insecta
- Order: Coleoptera
- Suborder: Polyphaga
- Infraorder: Cucujiformia
- Family: Chrysomelidae
- Subfamily: Cassidinae
- Tribe: Chalepini
- Genus: Corynispa; Uhmann, 1940
- Species: C. clavicornis

Binomial name
- Corynispa clavicornis (Uhmann, 1930)

Synonyms
- Uroplata (Heptatoma) clavicornis Uhmann, 1930

= Corynispa =

Genus of beetles

Corynispa is a genus of leaf beetles in the family Chrysomelidae. It is monotypic, being represented by the single species, Corynispa clavicornis, which is found in Brazil (Bahia, Rio de Janeiro).

== Biology ==
They have been recorded feeding on Stigmatophyllon fulgens.
