= Heptachispa concava =

Scientific classification
- Kingdom: Animalia
- Phylum: Arthropoda
- Class: Insecta
- Order: Coleoptera
- Suborder: Polyphaga
- Infraorder: Cucujiformia
- Family: Chrysomelidae
- Genus: Heptachispa
- Species: H. concava

Binomial name
- Heptachispa concava (Baly, 1864)

Synonyms
- Uroplata concava Baly, 1864; Heptispa innotata Pic, 1928

Species of beetle

Heptachispa concava is a species of beetle of the family Chrysomelidae. It is found in Brazil and French Guiana.
