= Temnocthispa =

Scientific classification
- Kingdom: Animalia
- Phylum: Arthropoda
- Clade: Pancrustacea
- Class: Insecta
- Order: Coleoptera
- Suborder: Polyphaga
- Infraorder: Cucujiformia
- Family: Chrysomelidae
- Subfamily: Cassidinae
- Tribe: Chalepini
- Genus: Temnocthispa; Uhmann, 1940

Genus of leaf beetles

Temnocthispa is a genus of beetles belonging to the family Chrysomelidae.

== Species ==
- Temnocthispa brevedentata (Pic, 1933)
- Temnocthispa deplanata (Waterhouse, 1881)
- Temnocthispa jocosa Uhmann, 1940
- Temnocthispa truncata (Fabricius, 1801)
