= Euprionota =

Scientific classification
- Kingdom: Animalia
- Phylum: Arthropoda
- Clade: Pancrustacea
- Class: Insecta
- Order: Coleoptera
- Suborder: Polyphaga
- Infraorder: Cucujiformia
- Family: Chrysomelidae
- Subfamily: Cassidinae
- Tribe: Chalepini
- Genus: Euprionota; Guérin-Méneville, 1844

Genus of leaf beetles

Euprionota is a genus of beetles belonging to the family Chrysomelidae.

== Species ==
- Euprionota aterrima Guérin-Méneville, 1844
- Euprionota bruchi (Uhmann, 1930)
- Euprionota gebieni (Uhmann, 1930)
- Euprionota subparallela (Pic, 1932)
