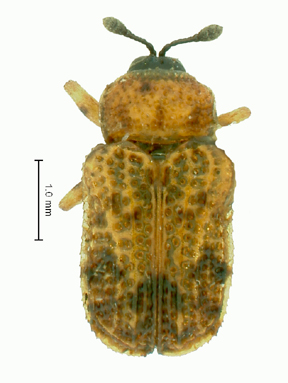

Scientific classification
- Kingdom: Animalia
- Phylum: Arthropoda
- Clade: Pancrustacea
- Class: Insecta
- Order: Coleoptera
- Suborder: Polyphaga
- Infraorder: Cucujiformia
- Family: Chrysomelidae
- Subfamily: Cassidinae
- Tribe: Chalepini
- Genus: Fossispa; Staines, 1989
- Species: F. lutena

Binomial name
- Fossispa lutena Staines, 1989

= Fossispa =

Genus of beetles

Fossispa is a genus of leaf beetles in the family Chrysomelidae. It is monotypic, being represented by the single species, Fossispa lutena, which is found in Guatemala, Jamaica and Mexico (Tamaulipas, Veracruz).

== Biology ==
The foodplant is unknown, but adults have been collected from Sida species, including Sida acuta.
