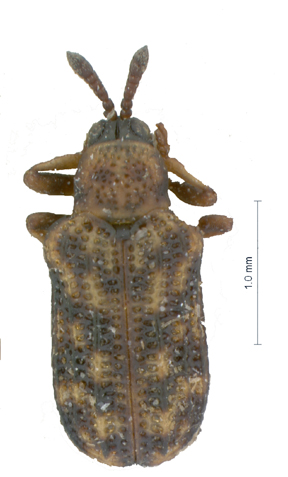

Scientific classification
- Kingdom: Animalia
- Phylum: Arthropoda
- Clade: Pancrustacea
- Class: Insecta
- Order: Coleoptera
- Suborder: Polyphaga
- Infraorder: Cucujiformia
- Family: Chrysomelidae
- Subfamily: Cassidinae
- Tribe: Chalepini
- Genus: Parvispa; Uhmann, 1940
- Species: P. marmorata

Binomial name
- Parvispa marmorata Uhmann, 1940

= Parvispa =

Genus of beetles

Parvispa is a genus of leaf beetles in the family Chrysomelidae. It is monotypic, being represented by the single species, Parvispa marmorata, which is found in Bolivia.
