= Clinocarispa =

Scientific classification
- Kingdom: Animalia
- Phylum: Arthropoda
- Clade: Pancrustacea
- Class: Insecta
- Order: Coleoptera
- Suborder: Polyphaga
- Infraorder: Cucujiformia
- Family: Chrysomelidae
- Subfamily: Cassidinae
- Tribe: Chalepini
- Genus: Clinocarispa; Uhmann, 1935

Genus of leaf beetles

Clinocarispa is a genus of beetles belonging to the family Chrysomelidae.

== Species ==
- Clinocarispa debeauxi Uhmann, 1940
- Clinocarispa humeralis (Fabricius, 1801)
- Clinocarispa plaumanni Uhmann, 1938
- Clinocarispa sauveuri (Chapuis, 1877)
- Clinocarispa subhomalina Uhmann, 1938
- Clinocarispa transversa Uhmann, 1963
- Clinocarispa vinculata (Weise, 1905)
