= Bruchia (beetle) =

Scientific classification
- Kingdom: Animalia
- Phylum: Arthropoda
- Class: Insecta
- Order: Coleoptera
- Suborder: Polyphaga
- Infraorder: Cucujiformia
- Family: Chrysomelidae
- Subfamily: Cassidinae
- Tribe: Chalepini
- Genus: Bruchia; Weise, 1906

Species
- See text

Synonyms
- Bruchiella Weise, 1916

Genus of beetles

Bruchia is a genus of beetles in the tribe Chalepini.

== Species ==
- Bruchia armata Staines, 2007 - Brazil, Colombia and Peru
- Bruchia fulvipes (Baly, 1885)
- Bruchia scapularis Staines, 2007 - Colombia
- Bruchia sparsa Weise, 1906
