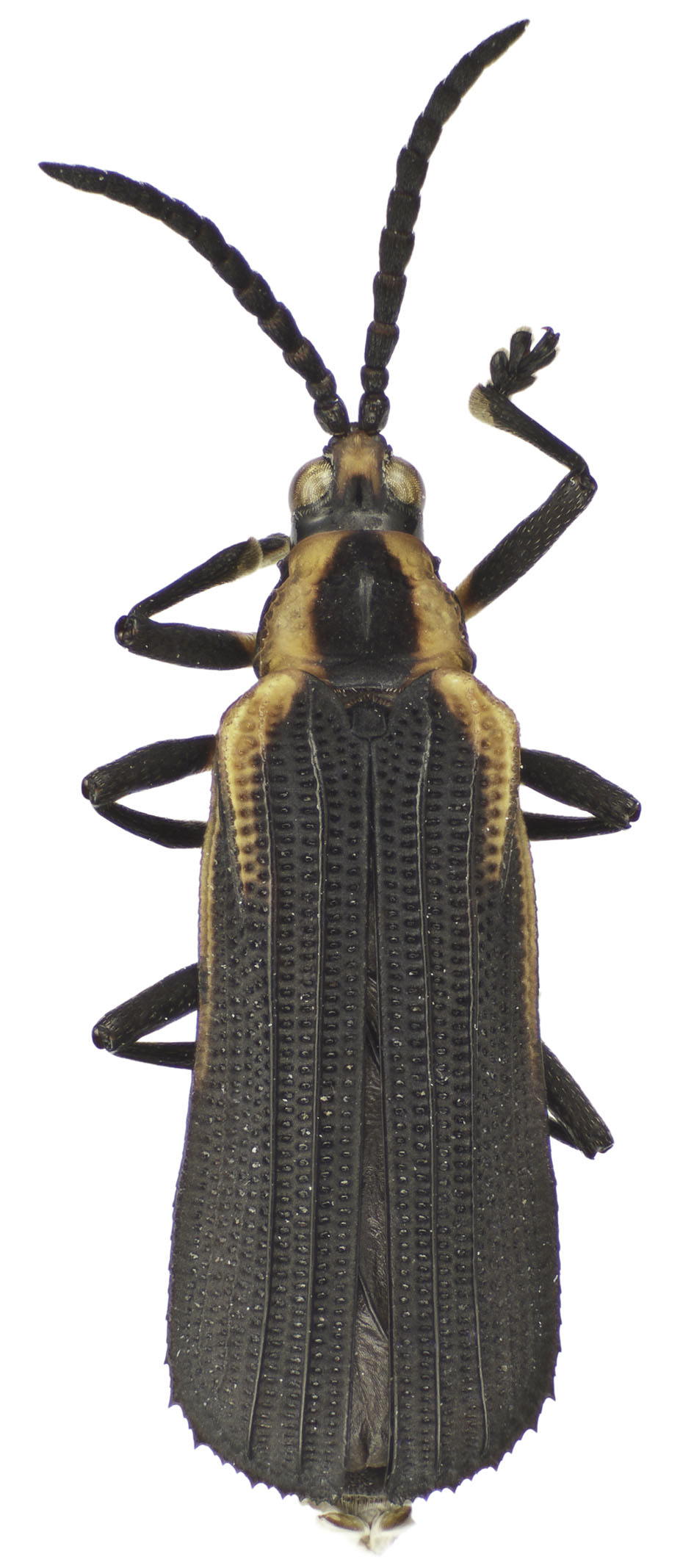

Scientific classification
- Kingdom: Animalia
- Phylum: Arthropoda
- Clade: Pancrustacea
- Class: Insecta
- Order: Coleoptera
- Suborder: Polyphaga
- Infraorder: Cucujiformia
- Family: Chrysomelidae
- Subfamily: Cassidinae
- Tribe: Chalepini
- Genus: Chalepispa; Uhmann, 1955
- Species: C. ignorata

Binomial name
- Chalepispa ignorata Uhmann, 1955

= Chalepispa =

Genus of beetles

Chalepispa is a genus of leaf beetles in the family Chrysomelidae. It is monotypic, being represented by the single species, Chalepispa ignorata, which is found in French Guiana.
