= Sternostena =

Scientific classification
- Kingdom: Animalia
- Phylum: Arthropoda
- Clade: Pancrustacea
- Class: Insecta
- Order: Coleoptera
- Suborder: Polyphaga
- Infraorder: Cucujiformia
- Family: Chrysomelidae
- Subfamily: Cassidinae
- Tribe: Chalepini
- Genus: Sternostena; Weise, 1910

Genus of leaf beetles

Sternostena is a genus of beetles belonging to the family Chrysomelidae.

== Species ==
- Sternostena antebasalis Uhmann, 1939
- Sternostena basalis (Baly, 1864)
- Sternostena costaricana Uhmann, 1938
- Sternostena laeta Weise, 1910
- Sternostena lateralis Pic, 1932
- Sternostena triangularis Uhmann, 1931
- Sternostena varians Weise, 1910
