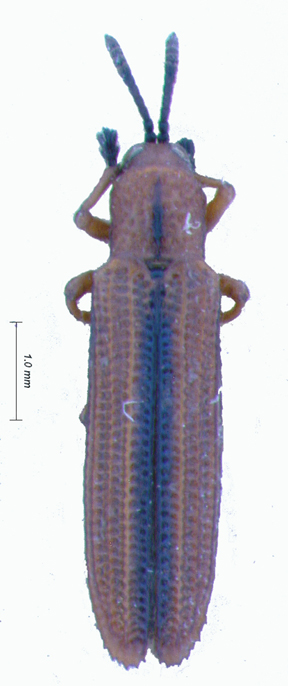

Scientific classification
- Kingdom: Animalia
- Phylum: Arthropoda
- Clade: Pancrustacea
- Class: Insecta
- Order: Coleoptera
- Suborder: Polyphaga
- Infraorder: Cucujiformia
- Family: Chrysomelidae
- Subfamily: Cassidinae
- Tribe: Chalepini
- Genus: Sternostenoides; Monrós & Viana, 1947
- Species: S. daguerrei

Binomial name
- Sternostenoides daguerrei Monrós & Viana, 1947

= Sternostenoides =

Genus of beetles

Sternostenoides is a genus of leaf beetles in the family Chrysomelidae. It is monotypic, being represented by the single species, Sternostenoides daguerrei, which is found in Argentina.

== Biology ==
The food plant is unknown.
