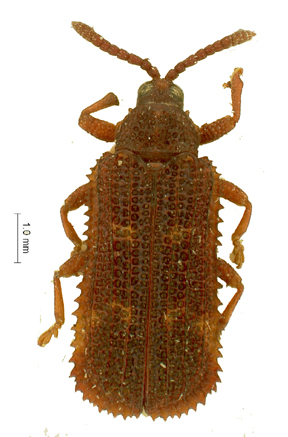

Scientific classification
- Kingdom: Animalia
- Phylum: Arthropoda
- Clade: Pancrustacea
- Class: Insecta
- Order: Coleoptera
- Suborder: Polyphaga
- Infraorder: Cucujiformia
- Family: Chrysomelidae
- Subfamily: Cassidinae
- Tribe: Chalepini
- Genus: Bothrispa; Uhmann, 1940
- Species: B. depressa

Binomial name
- Bothrispa depressa (Chapuis, 1877)

Synonyms
- Uroplata (Uroplata) depressa Chapuis, 1877

= Bothrispa =

Genus of beetles

Bothrispa is a genus of leaf beetles in the family Chrysomelidae. It is monotypic, being represented by the single species, Bothrispa depressa, which is found in Brazil (Goyaz, Matto Grosso, Minas Gerais, São Paulo).
