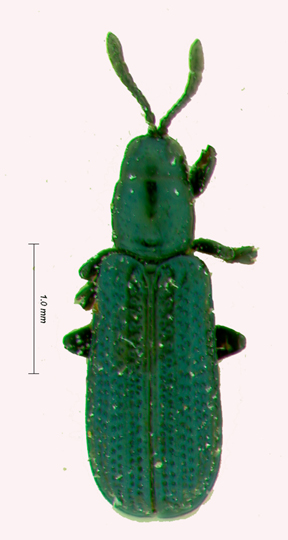

Scientific classification
- Kingdom: Animalia
- Phylum: Arthropoda
- Clade: Pancrustacea
- Class: Insecta
- Order: Coleoptera
- Suborder: Polyphaga
- Infraorder: Cucujiformia
- Family: Chrysomelidae
- Subfamily: Cassidinae
- Tribe: Chalepini
- Genus: Nanocthispa; Monrós & Viana, 1947
- Species: N. atra

Binomial name
- Nanocthispa atra (Weise, 1922)

Synonyms
- Octhispa atra Weise, 1922

= Nanocthispa =

Genus of beetles

Nanocthispa is a genus of leaf beetles in the family Chrysomelidae. It is monotypic, being represented by the single species, Nanocthispa atra, which is found in Argentina.
