= Heptachispa =

Scientific classification
- Kingdom: Animalia
- Phylum: Arthropoda
- Clade: Pancrustacea
- Class: Insecta
- Order: Coleoptera
- Suborder: Polyphaga
- Infraorder: Cucujiformia
- Family: Chrysomelidae
- Subfamily: Cassidinae
- Tribe: Chalepini
- Genus: Heptachispa; Uhmann, 1953

Synonyms
- Heptatoma Weise, 1921 (preocc.)

Genus of leaf beetles

Heptachispa is a genus of beetles belonging to the family Chrysomelidae.

== Species ==
- Heptachispa concava (Baly, 1864)
- Heptachispa crassicornis (Chapuis, 1877)
- Heptachispa delkeskampi (Uhmann, 1940)
- Heptachispa flavipes (Weise, 1921)
- Heptachispa lineaticollis (Pic, 1928)
- Heptachispa pallipes (Chapuis, 1877)
- Heptachispa sordidula (Weise, 1913)
- Heptachispa texta (Uhmann, 1937)
- Heptachispa vitticollis (Weise, 1911)
- Heptachispa rubida (Chapuis, 1877) described as Uroplata (Uroplata) rubida from Brazil (nomen dubium)
