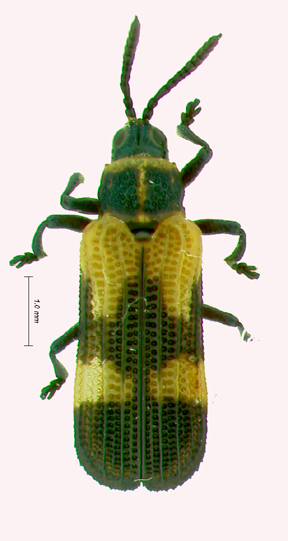

Scientific classification
- Kingdom: Animalia
- Phylum: Arthropoda
- Clade: Pancrustacea
- Class: Insecta
- Order: Coleoptera
- Suborder: Polyphaga
- Infraorder: Cucujiformia
- Family: Chrysomelidae
- Subfamily: Cassidinae
- Tribe: Chalepini
- Genus: Goyachalepus; Pic, 1929
- Species: G. donckieri

Binomial name
- Goyachalepus donckieri Pic, 1929

= Goyachalepus =

Genus of beetles

Goyachalepus is a genus of leaf beetles in the family Chrysomelidae. It is monotypic, being represented by the single species, Goyachalepus donckieri, which is found in Brazil (Goyaz).
