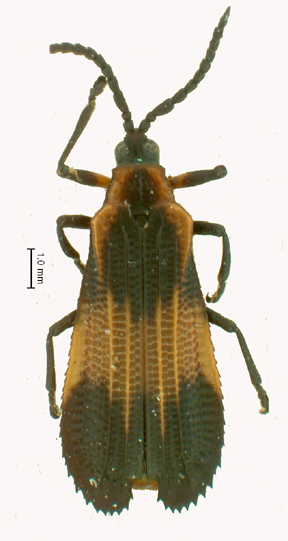
- Chalepotatus antennalis

Scientific classification
- Kingdom: Animalia
- Phylum: Arthropoda
- Clade: Pancrustacea
- Class: Insecta
- Order: Coleoptera
- Suborder: Polyphaga
- Infraorder: Cucujiformia
- Family: Chrysomelidae
- Subfamily: Cassidinae
- Tribe: Chalepini
- Genus: Chalepotatus; Weise, 1910

= Chalepotatus =

Genus of leaf beetles

Chalepotatus is a genus of beetles belonging to the family Chrysomelidae.

== Species ==
- Subgenus Chalepotatus
  - Chalepotatus coarctatus (Chapuis, 1877)
  - Chalepotatus integer Uhmann, 1935
  - Chalepotatus minor Weise, 1910
- Subgenus Macrochalepus Pic, 1929
  - Chalepotatus antennalis Weise, 1913
