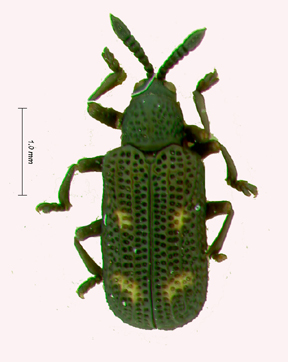

Scientific classification
- Kingdom: Animalia
- Phylum: Arthropoda
- Clade: Pancrustacea
- Class: Insecta
- Order: Coleoptera
- Suborder: Polyphaga
- Infraorder: Cucujiformia
- Family: Chrysomelidae
- Subfamily: Cassidinae
- Tribe: Chalepini
- Genus: Heptatomispa; Uhmann, 1940
- Species: H. kesseli

Binomial name
- Heptatomispa kesseli Uhmann, 1940

= Heptatomispa =

Genus of beetles

Heptatomispa is a genus of leaf beetles in the family Chrysomelidae. It is monotypic, being represented by the single species, Heptatomispa kesseli, which is found in Brazil.
