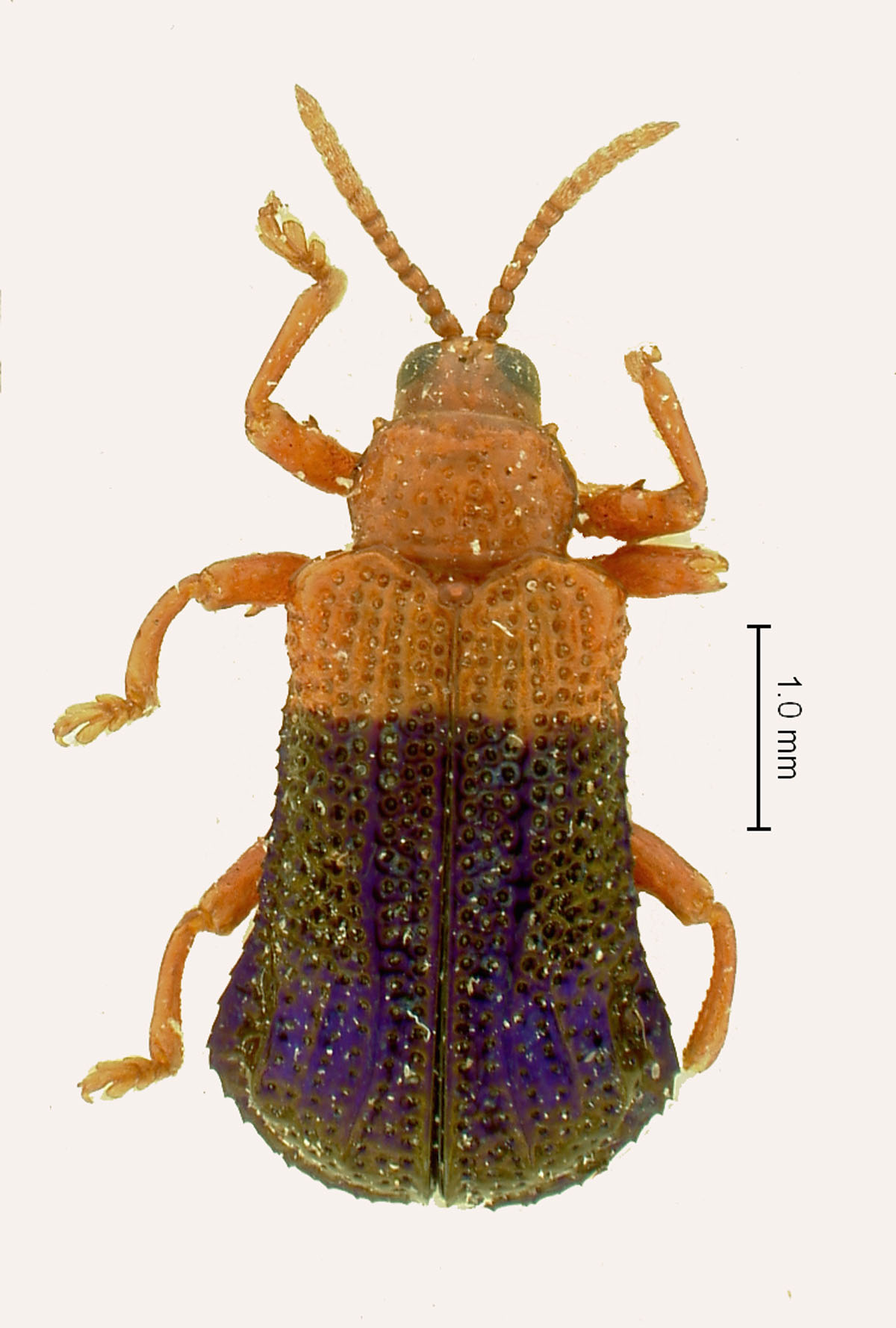

Scientific classification
- Kingdom: Animalia
- Phylum: Arthropoda
- Clade: Pancrustacea
- Class: Insecta
- Order: Coleoptera
- Suborder: Polyphaga
- Infraorder: Cucujiformia
- Family: Chrysomelidae
- Subfamily: Cassidinae
- Tribe: Chalepini
- Genus: Agathispa; Weise, 1905
- Species: A. dimidiata

Binomial name
- Agathispa dimidiata (Olivier, 1808)

Synonyms
- Hispa dimidiata Olivier, 1808

= Agathispa =

Genus of beetles

Agathispa is a genus of leaf beetles in the family Chrysomelidae. It is monotypic, being represented by the single species, Agathispa dimidiata, which is found in the Dominican Republic.
