= Stethispa =

Scientific classification
- Kingdom: Animalia
- Phylum: Arthropoda
- Clade: Pancrustacea
- Class: Insecta
- Order: Coleoptera
- Suborder: Polyphaga
- Infraorder: Cucujiformia
- Family: Chrysomelidae
- Subfamily: Cassidinae
- Tribe: Chalepini
- Genus: Stethispa; Baly, 1864

Genus of leaf beetles

Stethispa is a genus of beetles belonging to the family Chrysomelidae.

== Species ==
- Stethispa bonvouloirii Baly, 1864
- Stethispa brittoni Uhmann, 1963
- Stethispa bruchi Weise, 1906
- Stethispa chilensis Pic, 1933
- Stethispa confusa Baly, 1864
- Stethispa conicicollis Baly, 1864
- Stethispa crenatula Uhmann, 1938
- Stethispa elongata Pic, 1929
- Stethispa germaini Pic, 1927
- Stethispa gratiosa Baly, 1864
- Stethispa hastata (Fabricius, 1801)
- Stethispa impressicollis Pic, 1934
- Stethispa lineata Uhmann, 1935
- Stethispa lineaticollis Pic, 1927
- Stethispa longispina Pic, 1927
- Stethispa pallidior Pic, 1927
- Stethispa rudgeana Uhmann, 1938
- Stethispa rufospina Pic, 1929
- Stethispa unimaculata Pic, 1929
