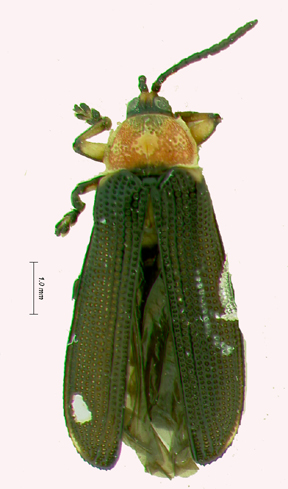
- Craspedonispa saccharina

Scientific classification
- Kingdom: Animalia
- Phylum: Arthropoda
- Clade: Pancrustacea
- Class: Insecta
- Order: Coleoptera
- Suborder: Polyphaga
- Infraorder: Cucujiformia
- Family: Chrysomelidae
- Subfamily: Cassidinae
- Tribe: Chalepini
- Genus: Craspedonispa; Weise, 1910

= Craspedonispa =

Genus of leaf beetles

Craspedonispa is a genus of beetles belonging to the family Chrysomelidae.

== Species ==
- Craspedonispa modesta Weise, 1910
- Craspedonispa saccharina Maulik, 1930
