= Decatelia =

Scientific classification
- Kingdom: Animalia
- Phylum: Arthropoda
- Clade: Pancrustacea
- Class: Insecta
- Order: Coleoptera
- Suborder: Polyphaga
- Infraorder: Cucujiformia
- Family: Chrysomelidae
- Subfamily: Cassidinae
- Tribe: Chalepini
- Genus: Decatelia; Weise, 1904

Synonyms
- Paradecatelia Uhmann, 1940

Genus of leaf beetles

Decatelia is a genus of beetles belonging to the family Chrysomelidae.

== Species ==
- Decatelia atritarsis Pic, 1927
- Decatelia costata Pic, 1927
- Decatelia lema Weise, 1904
- Decatelia pallipes Weise, 1922
- Decatelia testaceicollis Pic, 1934
- Decatelia testaceipes Pic, 1934
- Decatelia varipes Weise, 1910
