= Stethispa gratiosa =

Scientific classification
- Kingdom: Animalia
- Phylum: Arthropoda
- Clade: Pancrustacea
- Class: Insecta
- Order: Coleoptera
- Suborder: Polyphaga
- Infraorder: Cucujiformia
- Family: Chrysomelidae
- Genus: Stethispa
- Species: S. gratiosa

Binomial name
- Stethispa gratiosa Baly, 1864

Species of beetle

Stethispa gratiosa is a species of beetle of the family Chrysomelidae. It is found in Brazil and Peru.

== Description ==
The thorax is not twice as broad as long, the sides nearly straight and parallel from their base to the middle, then obliquely narrowed and sinuate to the apex. The lateral border is obsoletely crenulate, produced in the middle into an indistinct tooth, the anterior angles armed with an obtuse tooth, the hinder angles unarmed. The upper surface is transversely convex, flattened and transversely excavated behind the middle, deeply punctate. The middle of the disk is closely variolose and the medial line has an indistinct longitudinal groove.

== Biology ==
The food plant is unknown.
