= Charistena =

Scientific classification
- Kingdom: Animalia
- Phylum: Arthropoda
- Clade: Pancrustacea
- Class: Insecta
- Order: Coleoptera
- Suborder: Polyphaga
- Infraorder: Cucujiformia
- Family: Chrysomelidae
- Subfamily: Cassidinae
- Tribe: Chalepini
- Genus: Charistena; Baly, 1864

Genus of leaf beetles

Charistena is a genus of beetles belonging to the family Chrysomelidae.

== Species ==
- Charistena bergi (Duvivier, 1890)
- Charistena brasiliensis Pic, 1927
- Charistena brevelineata Pic, 1927
- Charistena brevenotata Pic, 1927
- Charistena minima Pic, 1934
- Charistena ruficollis (Fabricius, 1801)
