= List of Microctenochira species =

This is a list of 110 species in Microctenochira, a genus of tortoise beetles in the family Chrysomelidae.

== Microctenochira species ==
- Microctenochira aberrata (Weise, 1904)^{i c g}
- Microctenochira achardi (Spaeth, 1926)^{i c}
- Microctenochira aciculata (Boheman, 1855)^{i c g}
- Microctenochira annulata (Spaeth, 1926)^{i c}
- Microctenochira anxia (Boheman, 1855)^{i c g}
- Microctenochira arcana (Spaeth, 1926)^{i c g}
- Microctenochira aspersa (Champion, 1894)^{i c g}
- Microctenochira belizensis Borowiec, 2007^{i c g}
- Microctenochira bifenestrata (Boheman, 1855)^{i c g}
- Microctenochira bilobata (Boheman, 1855)^{i c}
- Microctenochira biolleyi (Spaeth, 1926)^{i c g}
- Microctenochira bipellucida (Boheman, 1855)^{i c g}
- Microctenochira bogotana (Spaeth, 1926)^{i c g}
- Microctenochira bonvouloiri (Boheman, 1855)^{i c g b}
- Microctenochira brasiliensis Swietojanska and Borowiec, 1999^{i c g}
- Microctenochira championi (Spaeth, 1926)^{i c g}
- Microctenochira chapada Swietojanska and Borowiec, 1995^{i c g}
- Microctenochira chryseis (Spaeth, 1926)^{i c g}
- Microctenochira circinaria (Erichson, 1847)^{i c g}
- Microctenochira circumcincta (Boheman, 1855)^{i c g}
- Microctenochira conscripta (Boheman, 1855)^{i c g}
- Microctenochira coronata (Boheman, 1855)^{i c g}
- Microctenochira costaricencis (Spaeth, 1909)^{i c g}
- Microctenochira cruxflava (Champion, 1894)^{i c g}
- Microctenochira cumulata (Boheman, 1855)^{i c g}
- Microctenochira danielssoni Borowiec, 1995^{i c g}
- Microctenochira decora (Spaeth, 1926)^{i c g}
- Microctenochira diabolica (Spaeth, 1926)^{i c g}
- Microctenochira difficilis (Boheman, 1855)^{i c g}
- Microctenochira diffinis (Boheman, 1855)^{i c g}
- Microctenochira diophthalma (Champion, 1894)^{i c g}
- Microctenochira discrepans (Spaeth, 1926)^{i c g}
- Microctenochira discreta (Spaeth, 1926)^{i c g}
- Microctenochira dissimilis (Boheman, 1855)^{i c g}
- Microctenochira dissoluta (Spaeth, 1901)^{i c g}
- Microctenochira divulsa (Boheman, 1855)^{i c g}
- Microctenochira excelsa (Spaeth, 1926)^{i c g}
- Microctenochira excurrens (Spaeth, 1926)^{i c g}
- Microctenochira fairmairei (Boheman, 1855)^{i c g}
- Microctenochira ferranti (Spaeth, 1926)^{i c}
- Microctenochira flavonotata (Boheman, 1855)^{i c}
- Microctenochira fraterna (Boheman, 1855)^{i c g}
- Microctenochira freyi (Boheman, 1862)^{i c g}
- Microctenochira gagatina (Spaeth, 1902)^{i c g}
- Microctenochira gemina (Boheman, 1855)^{i c g}
- Microctenochira gemonia (Spaeth, 1926)^{i c g}
- Microctenochira gnata (Spaeth, 1926)^{i c g}
- Microctenochira guttula (Spaeth, 1926)^{i c g}
- Microctenochira hectica (Boheman, 1855)^{i c g}
- Microctenochira hieroglyphica (Boheman, 1855)^{i c g}
- Microctenochira hypocrita (Boheman, 1855)^{i c g}
- Microctenochira impolluta (Spaeth, 1926)^{i c g}
- Microctenochira infantula (Boheman, 1862)^{i c g}
- Microctenochira insuperata (Spaeth, 1926)^{i c g}
- Microctenochira jousselini (Boheman, 1855)^{i c g}
- Microctenochira libidinosa (Spaeth, 1926)^{i c g}
- Microctenochira lindigi (Kirsch, 1865)^{i c g}
- Microctenochira liquidata (Spaeth, 1926)^{i c g}
- Microctenochira lugubris (Boheman, 1862)^{i c g}
- Microctenochira mapiriensis Borowiec, 2002^{i c g}
- Microctenochira marginata (Spaeth, 1909)^{i c g}
- Microctenochira media (Boheman, 1855)^{i c g}
- Microctenochira melanota (Boheman, 1855)^{i c g}
- Microctenochira minax (Spaeth, 1926)^{i c g}
- Microctenochira mucuryensis (Spaeth, 1932)^{i c g}
- Microctenochira mystica (Boheman, 1855)^{i c g}
- Microctenochira napaea (Boheman, 1862)^{i c g}
- Microctenochira nigrocincta (Wagener, 1877)^{i c g}
- Microctenochira nigroplagiata (Spaeth, 1932)^{i c g}
- Microctenochira obscurata Swietojanska and Borowiec, 1999^{i c g}
- Microctenochira optata (Boheman, 1855)^{i c g}
- Microctenochira ornaticollis (Spaeth, 1926)^{i c g}
- Microctenochira palmata (Boheman, 1855)^{i c g}
- Microctenochira panamensis Swietojanska and Borowiec, 1999^{i c g}
- Microctenochira papulosa (Boheman, 1855)^{i c g}
- Microctenochira patruelis (Boheman, 1855)^{i c g}
- Microctenochira peltata (Boheman, 1855)^{i c g}
- Microctenochira plagifera (Boheman, 1855)^{i c g}
- Microctenochira plebeja (Boheman, 1855)^{i c g}
- Microctenochira plicata (Boheman, 1855)^{i c g}
- Microctenochira porosa (Boheman, 1855)^{i c g}
- Microctenochira pumicosa (Boheman, 1862)^{i c g}
- Microctenochira punicea (Boheman, 1855)^{i c g}
- Microctenochira quadrata (De Geer, 1775)^{i c g}
- Microctenochira reticularis (De Geer, 1775)^{i c g}
- Microctenochira rubrocincta (Boheman, 1855)^{i c}
- Microctenochira sagulata (Boheman, 1862)^{i c g}
- Microctenochira salebrata (Boheman, 1862)^{i c g}
- Microctenochira sanguinidorsis (Spaeth, 1926)^{i c g}
- Microctenochira scabra (Boheman, 1855)^{i c g}
- Microctenochira scopus (Spaeth, 1926)^{i c g}
- Microctenochira semifasciata (Boheman, 1855)^{i c g}
- Microctenochira semilobata (Wagener, 1877)^{i c g}
- Microctenochira semilunaris (Boheman, 1862)^{i c g}
- Microctenochira sepulchralis (Boheman, 1855)^{i c g}
- Microctenochira sertata (Erichson, 1847)^{i c g}
- Microctenochira servula (Boheman, 1855)^{i c g}
- Microctenochira severa (Boheman, 1855)^{i c g}
- Microctenochira signaticollis (Boheman, 1855)^{i c g}
- Microctenochira similata (Boheman, 1855)^{i c g}
- Microctenochira soleifera (Spaeth, 1926)^{i c g}
- Microctenochira stali (Boheman, 1862)^{i c g}
- Microctenochira stigmatica (Boheman, 1855)^{i c g}
- Microctenochira tabida (Boheman, 1855)^{i c g}
- Microctenochira trepida (Boheman, 1855)^{i c g}
- Microctenochira triplagiata (Spaeth, 1926)^{i c g}
- Microctenochira varicornis (Spaeth, 1926)^{i c g}
- Microctenochira villica (Boheman, 1855)^{i c g}
- Microctenochira vivida (Boheman, 1855)^{i c g}
- Microctenochira waterhousei (Boheman, 1855)^{i c g}

Data sources: i = ITIS, c = Catalogue of Life, g = GBIF, b = Bugguide.net
