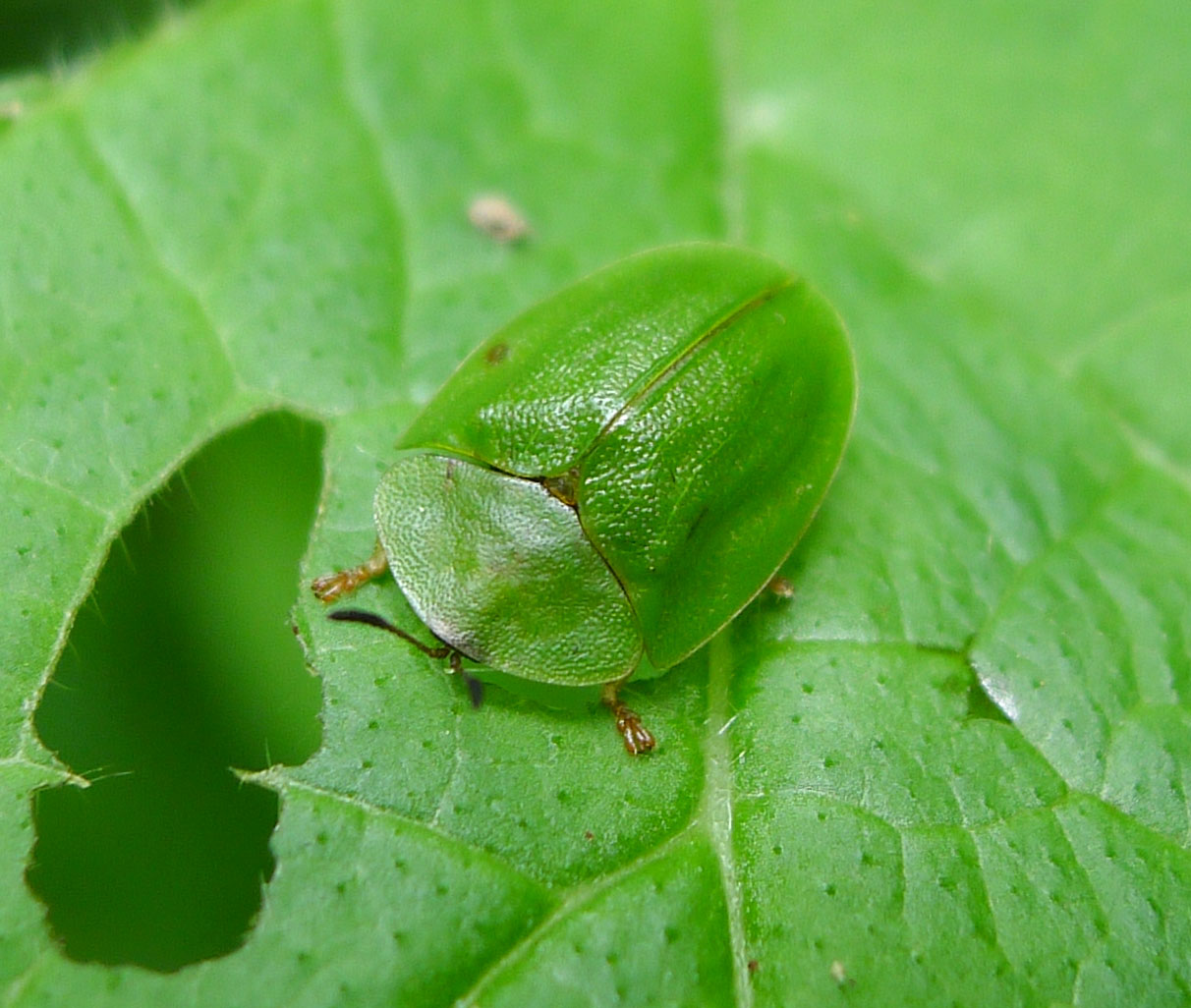
- Cassida viridis

Scientific classification
- Kingdom: Animalia
- Phylum: Arthropoda
- Clade: Pancrustacea
- Class: Insecta
- Order: Coleoptera
- Suborder: Polyphaga
- Infraorder: Cucujiformia
- Family: Chrysomelidae
- Subfamily: Cassidinae
- Tribe: Cassidini; Gyllenhal, 1813

Genera
- ~40; see text

Synonyms
- Cassideae Gyllenhal, 1813; Cassidini: Gressitt, 1952; Basiptites Chapuis, 1875; Hybosites Chapuis, 1875; Cassidites: Chapuis, 1875; Chiridites Chapuis, 1875; Coptocyclitae Spaeth, 1926; Charidotitae Spaeth, 1942; Charidotini: Hincks, 1952

= Cassidini =

Tribe of beetles

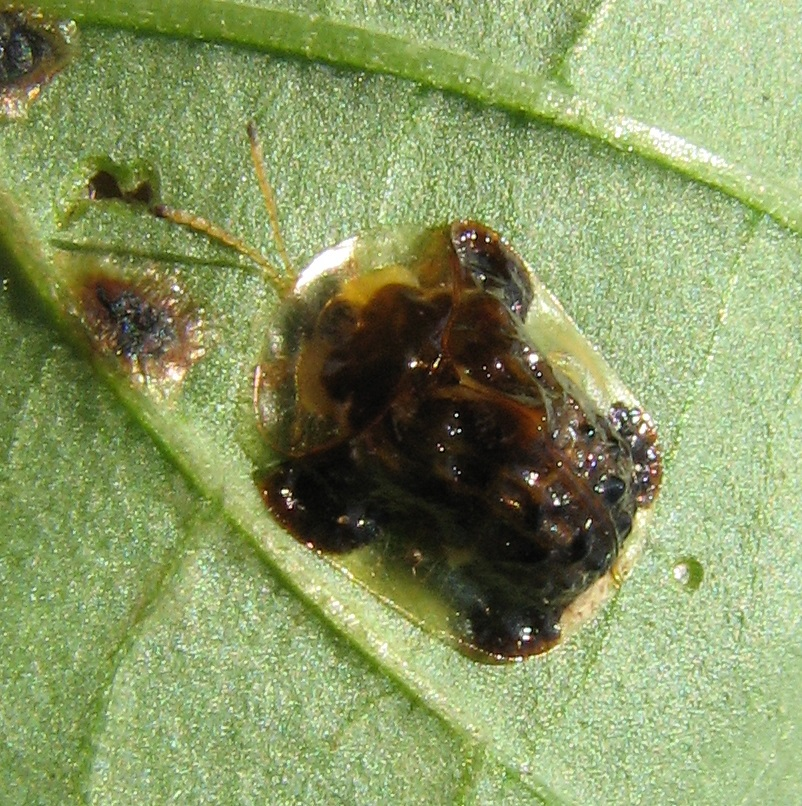
Plagiometriona clavata

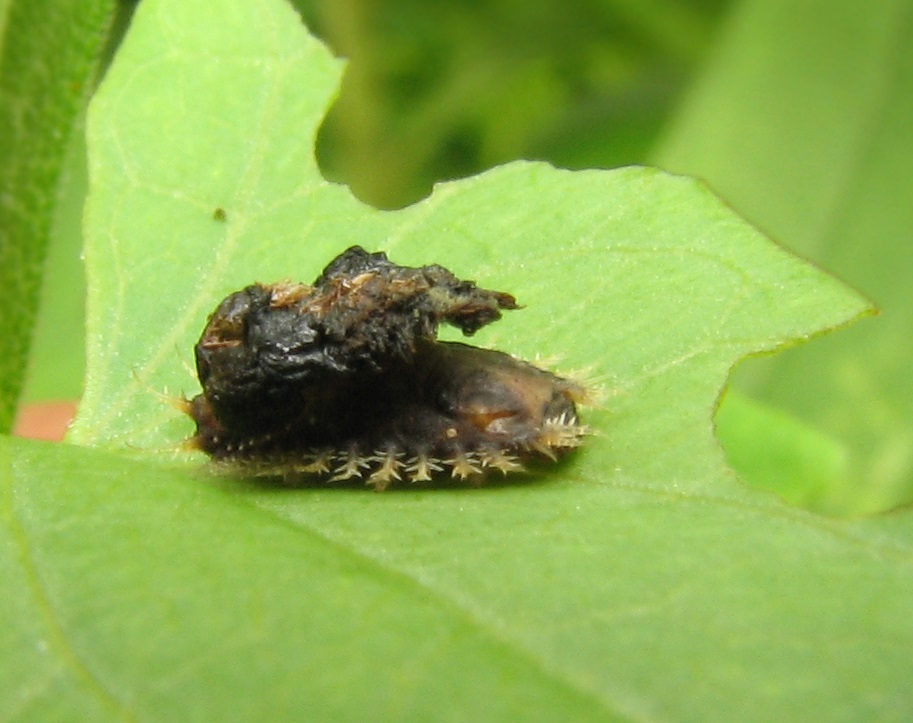
Charidotella sexpunctata larva covered by fecal shield

The Cassidini are a tribe within the leaf beetle subfamily Cassidinae. The Cassidini comprises approximately 40 genera worldwide, and is one of the largest tribes in the subfamily, containing most of the genera and species known collectively as "tortoise beetles". The subfamily names Cassidinae and Hispinae were both founded by Gyllenhal in the same 1813 book, but following the Principle of the First Reviser, Chen in this case, priority is given to the name Cassidinae.

In a 2017 cladistic analysis of Cassidini based on morphological characters, Cassidini was found to be nonmonophyletic with respect to Aspidimorphini, leading the authors of the study to formally synonymize the latter with the former. The same authors also suggested that Ischyrosonychini should also be included within Cassidini.

== Genera ==
- Acrocassis
- Aethiopocassis
- Agroiconota
- Aidoia
- Andevocassis
- Aporocassida
- Austropsecadia
- Basipta
- Bradycassis
- Capelocassis
- Cassida
- Chacocassis
- Charidotella
- Charidotis
- Chelysida
- Chersinellina
- Chiridopsis
- Chiridula
- Coptocycla
- Crambelea
- Cteisella
- Ctenocassida
- Ctenocharidotis
- Ctenophilaspis
- Cyclocassis
- Deloyala
- Drepanocassis
- Emdenia
- Erbolaspis
- Eremionycha
- Erepsocassis
- Exestastica
- Floridocassis
- Fornicocassis
- Glyphocassis
- Gratiana
- Hovacassis
- Hybosa
- Hypocassida
- Ischiocassis
- Ischnocodia
- Ischyronota
- Jonthonota
- Leptocodia
- Limnocassis
- Lorentzocassis
- Macromonycha
- Malayocassis
- Meroscalsis
- Metriona
- Metrionella
- Mexicaspis
- Microctenochira
- Nabathea
- Nuzonia
- Oocassida
- Opacinota
- Orobiocassis
- Oxylepus
- Parachirida
- Parorectis
- Pilemostoma
- Plagiometriona (incl. Helocassis)
- Psalidoma
- Pseudoctenochira
- Rhacocassis
- Rhoia
- Rhytidocassis
- Saulaspis
- Scaeocassis
- Seminabathea
- Silana
- Smeringaspis
- Sphenocassis
- Strongylocassis
- Syngambria
- Tapinaspis
- Tegocassis
- Tetracassis
- Thlaspida
- Thlaspidosoma
- Thlaspidula
- Trichaspis
- Trigonocassis
- Vietocassis

== Selected former genera ==
- Orexita
