= Bradycassis sordescens =

Scientific classification
- Kingdom: Animalia
- Phylum: Arthropoda
- Clade: Pancrustacea
- Class: Insecta
- Order: Coleoptera
- Suborder: Polyphaga
- Infraorder: Cucujiformia
- Family: Chrysomelidae
- Genus: Bradycassis
- Species: B. sordescens

Binomial name
- Bradycassis sordescens (Spaeth, 1926)

Synonyms
- Metriona sordescens Spaeth, 1926

Species of beetle

Bradycassis sordescens is a species of beetle of the family Chrysomelidae. It is found in Argentina, Brazil (Bahia, Mato Grosso, Pernambuco) and Paraguay.
