= Eremionycha =

Scientific classification
- Kingdom: Animalia
- Phylum: Arthropoda
- Clade: Pancrustacea
- Class: Insecta
- Order: Coleoptera
- Suborder: Polyphaga
- Infraorder: Cucujiformia
- Family: Chrysomelidae
- Subfamily: Cassidinae
- Tribe: Cassidini
- Genus: Eremionycha; Spaeth, 1911
- Species: E. bahiana

Binomial name
- Eremionycha bahiana (Boheman, 1855)

Synonyms
- Coptocycla bahiana Boheman, 1855; Eremionycha miraculosa Spacth, 1911

Genus of beetles

Eremionycha is a genus of beetle of the family Chrysomelidae. It is monotypic, being represented by the single species, Eremionycha bahiana, which is found in Brazil (Bahia, Espírito Santo, Piauí, Santa Catarina, São Paulo, Pernambuco).
