= Aidoia =

Scientific classification
- Kingdom: Animalia
- Phylum: Arthropoda
- Clade: Pancrustacea
- Class: Insecta
- Order: Coleoptera
- Suborder: Polyphaga
- Infraorder: Cucujiformia
- Family: Chrysomelidae
- Subfamily: Cassidinae
- Tribe: Cassidini
- Genus: Aidoia; Spaeth, 1952
- Species: A. nubilosa

Binomial name
- Aidoia nubilosa Boheman, 1855

Synonyms
- Coptocycla nubilosa Boheman, 1855

Genus of beetles

Aidoia is a genus of leaf beetles in the family Chrysomelidae. It is monotypic, being represented by the single species, Aidoia nubilosa, which is found in Colombia and Ecuador.
