= Parorectis =

Scientific classification
- Kingdom: Animalia
- Phylum: Arthropoda
- Clade: Pancrustacea
- Class: Insecta
- Order: Coleoptera
- Suborder: Polyphaga
- Infraorder: Cucujiformia
- Family: Chrysomelidae
- Tribe: Cassidini
- Genus: Parorectis; Spaeth, 1901

Genus of beetles

Parorectis is a genus of tortoise beetles in the family Chrysomelidae. There are at least three described species in Parorectis.

== Species ==
These three species belong to the genus Parorectis:

- Parorectis callosa (Boheman, 1854)
- Parorectis rugosa (Boheman, 1854)
- Parorectis sublaevis (Barber, 1946)
