= Andevocassis =

Scientific classification
- Kingdom: Animalia
- Phylum: Arthropoda
- Clade: Pancrustacea
- Class: Insecta
- Order: Coleoptera
- Suborder: Polyphaga
- Infraorder: Cucujiformia
- Family: Chrysomelidae
- Subfamily: Cassidinae
- Tribe: Cassidini
- Genus: Andevocassis; Spaeth, 1924
- Species: A. picta

Binomial name
- Andevocassis picta (Spaeth, 1905)

Synonyms
- Cassida nigroguttata Fairmaire, 1904 (preocc.); Cassida picta Spaeth, 1905

Genus of beetles

Andevocassis is a genus of leaf beetles in the family Chrysomelidae. It is monotypic, being represented by the single species, Andevocassis picta, which is found in central and northern Madagascar.
