= Metrionella =

Scientific classification
- Kingdom: Animalia
- Phylum: Arthropoda
- Clade: Pancrustacea
- Class: Insecta
- Order: Coleoptera
- Suborder: Polyphaga
- Infraorder: Cucujiformia
- Family: Chrysomelidae
- Tribe: Cassidini
- Genus: Metrionella; Spaeth, 1932

Genus of beetles

Metrionella is a genus of tortoise beetles in the family Chrysomelidae. There are about 12 described species in Metrionella.

== Species ==
These 12 species belong to the genus Metrionella:

- Metrionella angularis (Champion, 1894)
- Metrionella biguttula Spaeth, 1932
- Metrionella bilimeki (Spaeth, 1932)
- Metrionella calva (Boheman, 1855)
- Metrionella connata Spaeth, 1932
- Metrionella erratica (Boheman, 1855)
- Metrionella glabrescens Spaeth, 1932
- Metrionella irrorata Spaeth, 1932
- Metrionella placans Spaeth, 1932
- Metrionella strandi Spaeth, 1932
- Metrionella tucumana Borowiec, 2006
- Metrionella tumacoensis Borowiec, 2002
