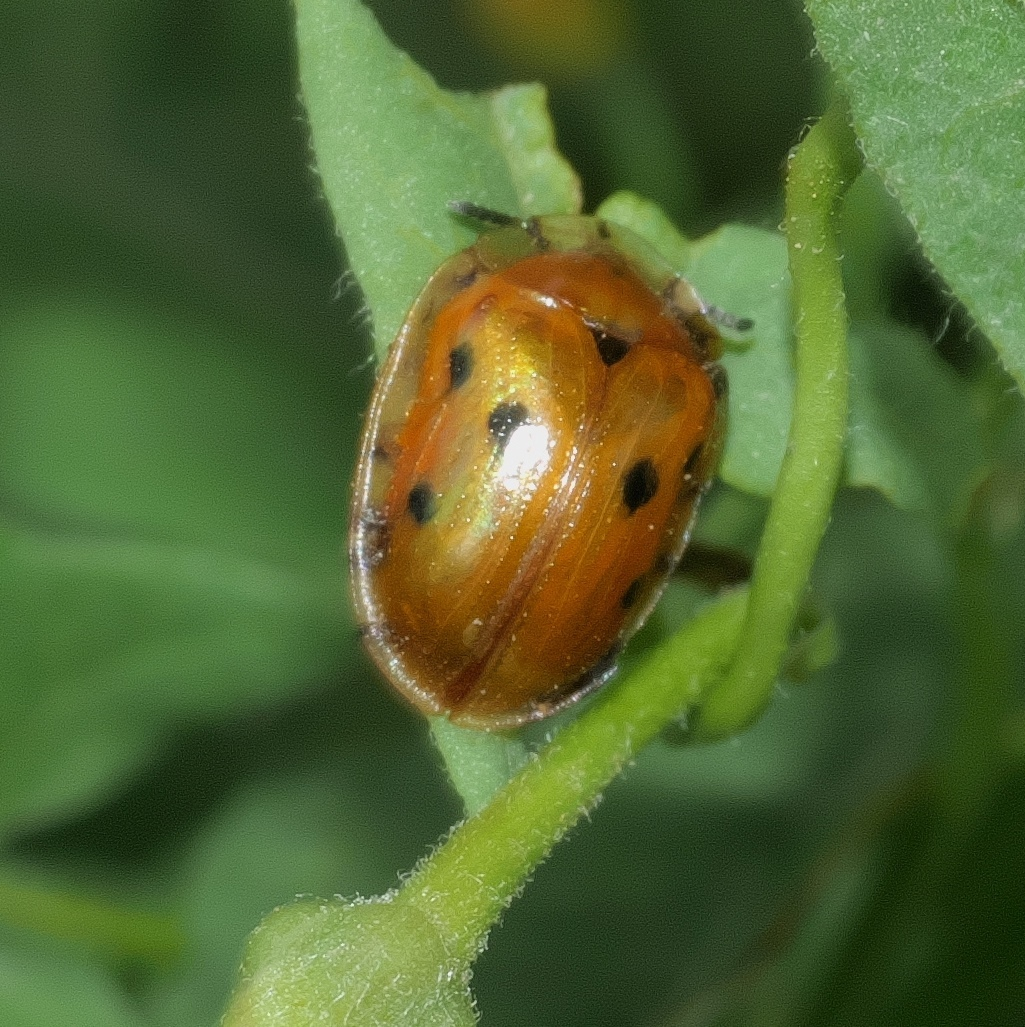
- Jonthonota nigripes, Oklahoma

Scientific classification
- Kingdom: Animalia
- Phylum: Arthropoda
- Clade: Pancrustacea
- Class: Insecta
- Order: Coleoptera
- Suborder: Polyphaga
- Infraorder: Cucujiformia
- Family: Chrysomelidae
- Tribe: Cassidini
- Genus: Jonthonota; Spaeth, 1913

= Jonthonota =

Genus of beetles

Jonthonota is a genus of tortoise beetles in the family Chrysomelidae. There are at least two described species in Jonthonota.

== Species ==
These two species belong to the genus Jonthonota:

- Jonthonota mexicana (Champion, 1894)
- Jonthonota nigripes (Olivier, 1790) (blacklegged tortoise beetle)
