= Tegocassis =

Scientific classification
- Kingdom: Animalia
- Phylum: Arthropoda
- Clade: Pancrustacea
- Class: Insecta
- Order: Coleoptera
- Suborder: Polyphaga
- Infraorder: Cucujiformia
- Family: Chrysomelidae
- Subfamily: Cassidinae
- Tribe: Cassidini
- Genus: Tegocassis; Spaeth, 1924
- Species: T. corpulenta

Binomial name
- Tegocassis corpulenta (Weise, 1904)

Synonyms
- Cassida corpulenta Weise, 1904

Genus of beetle

Tegocassis is a genus of beetles that belongs to the family of leaf beetles (Chrysomelidae), containing a single species, T. corpulenta.

== Appearance ==
A medium-sized, broadly oval, glossy, yellow-brown (at least in dead specimens) Cassidinae. Seen from the side, the body is conical. The antennae are filamentous and medium length. The body is actually quite normally proportioned, with the pronotum and the wings being slightly extended to the sides so that they completely cover the upper side, both the head and legs are hidden under this shield. When grown, the body shape becomes broadly oval. The pronotum is rounded, the wings slightly protruding. The edges of the pronotum and the cover wings form an almost continuous curve. The top is very finely punctured.

== Life cycle ==
Both the larvae and the adult (imago) beetles live by eating leaves on nearby plants. The adult (imago) sits close to the plant and the large flat neck shield and cover wings make the beetle very difficult to detect and it is difficult for predators to reach the vulnerable underside. The larvae tend to hide under a roof of old feces and plant remains that are attached to the forward bent hindquarters.

== Coverage ==
The species is very common in Cameroon, Tanzania and Madagascar.

== Literature ==
- Borowiec, L. 1999. A world catalogue of the Cassidinae (Coleoptera: Chrysomelidae). Biologica Silesiae, Wroclaw.
- Tegocassis at ITIS
