= Cteisella amicta =

Scientific classification
- Kingdom: Animalia
- Phylum: Arthropoda
- Clade: Pancrustacea
- Class: Insecta
- Order: Coleoptera
- Suborder: Polyphaga
- Infraorder: Cucujiformia
- Family: Chrysomelidae
- Genus: Cteisella
- Species: C. amicta

Binomial name
- Cteisella amicta (Boheman, 1855)

Synonyms
- Coptocycla amicta Boheman, 1855

Species of beetle

Cteisella amicta is a species of beetle of the family Chrysomelidae. It is found in Brazil (Bahia, Goiás, Para, Pernambuco), French Guiana and Trinidad.
