= Ctenocharidotis beata =

Scientific classification
- Kingdom: Animalia
- Phylum: Arthropoda
- Clade: Pancrustacea
- Class: Insecta
- Order: Coleoptera
- Suborder: Polyphaga
- Infraorder: Cucujiformia
- Family: Chrysomelidae
- Genus: Ctenocharidotis
- Species: C. beata

Binomial name
- Ctenocharidotis beata (Spaeth, 1926)

Synonyms
- Cteisella beata Spaeth, 1926

Species of beetle

Ctenocharidotis beata is a species of beetle of the family Chrysomelidae. It is found in Brazil (Bahia, Pernambuco).
