= Cteisella confusa =

Scientific classification
- Kingdom: Animalia
- Phylum: Arthropoda
- Clade: Pancrustacea
- Class: Insecta
- Order: Coleoptera
- Suborder: Polyphaga
- Infraorder: Cucujiformia
- Family: Chrysomelidae
- Genus: Cteisella
- Species: C. confusa

Binomial name
- Cteisella confusa (Boheman, 1855)

Synonyms
- Coptocycla confusa Boheman, 1855

Species of beetle

Cteisella confusa is a species of beetle of the family Chrysomelidae. It is found in Argentina, Bolivia, Brazil (Mato Grosso do Sul, Pará, Paraná, Rio Grande do Sul, Rio de Janeiro, Santa Catarina, São Paulo, Pernambuco), Paraguay and Peru.
