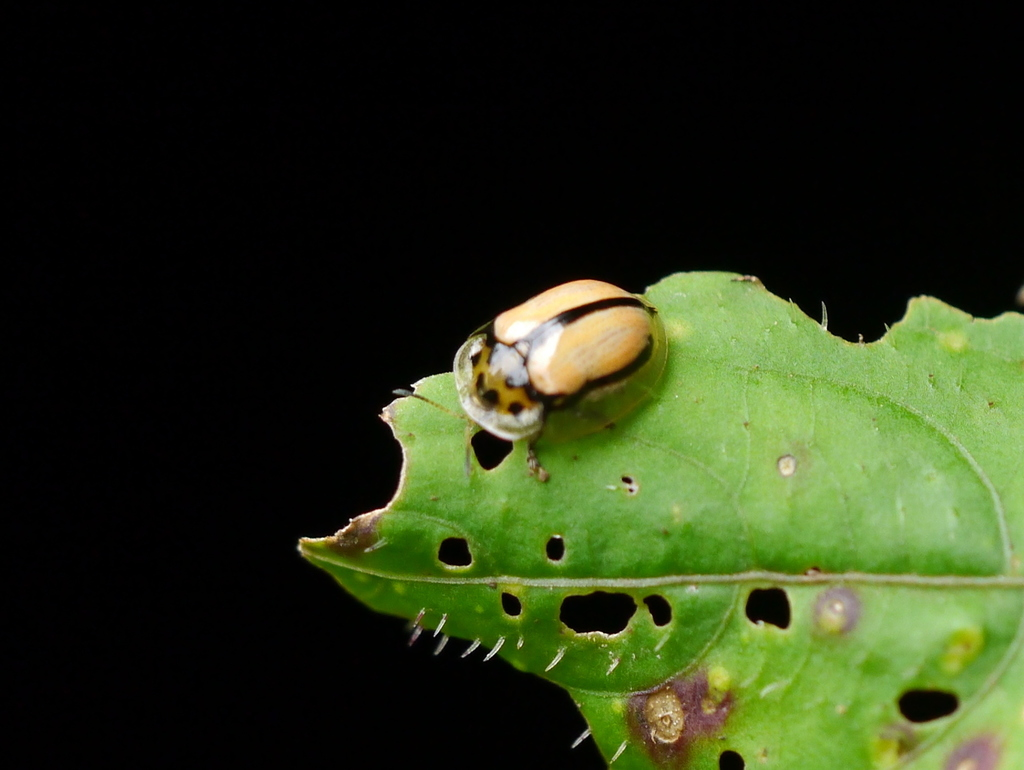
- Aethiopocassis cinctidorsum
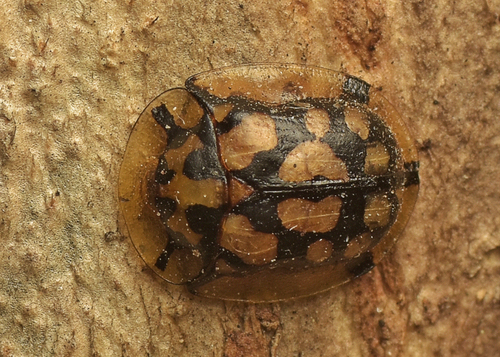
- Aethiopocassis fugax

Scientific classification
- Kingdom: Animalia
- Phylum: Arthropoda
- Clade: Pancrustacea
- Class: Insecta
- Order: Coleoptera
- Suborder: Polyphaga
- Infraorder: Cucujiformia
- Family: Chrysomelidae
- Subfamily: Cassidinae
- Tribe: Cassidini
- Genus: Aethiopocassis; Spaeth, 1922

Synonyms
- Cassida (Aethiopocassis) Spaeth, 1922

= Aethiopocassis =

Genus of leaf beetles

Aethiopocassis is a genus of leaf beetles of the family Chrysomelidae.

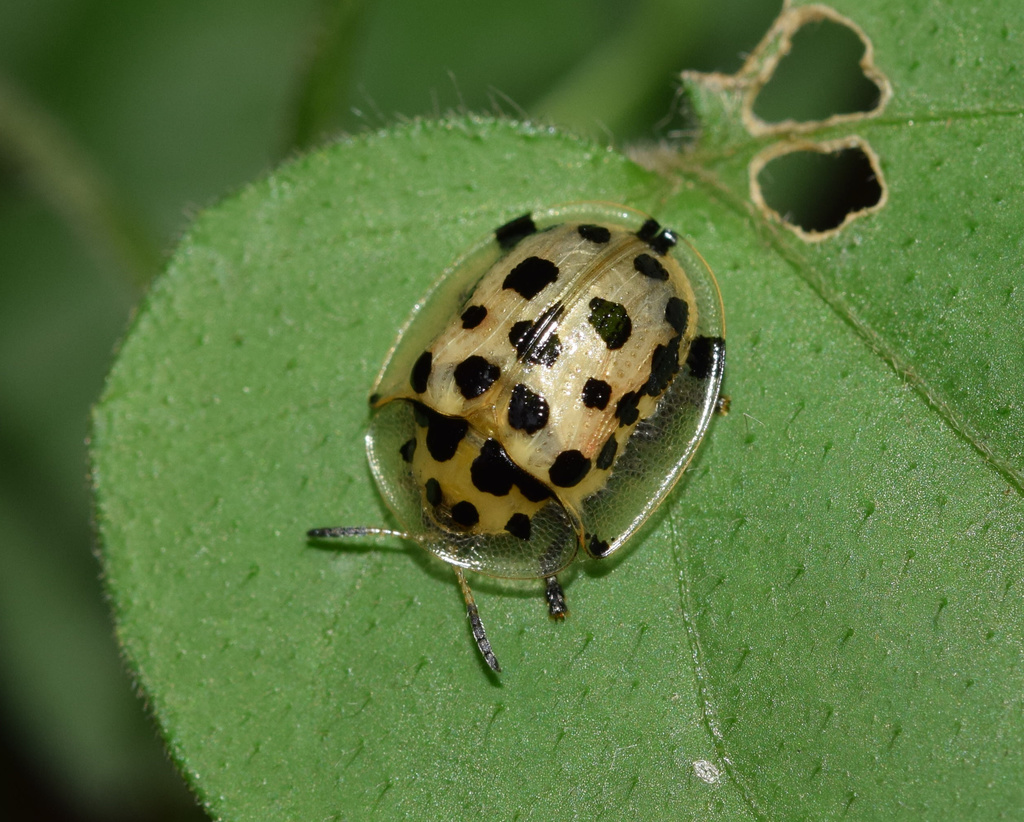
Aethiopocassis vigintimaculata

== Species ==
- Aethiopocassis angolensis Spaeth, 1926
- Aethiopocassis angulicollis Borowiec & Świętojańska, 2018
- Aethiopocassis cinctidorsum (Weise, 1912)
- Aethiopocassis dewittei Borowiec & Świętojańska, 2018
- Aethiopocassis flaccida (Spaeth, 1924)
- Aethiopocassis fugax (Spaeth, 1906)
- Aethiopocassis gallarum (Spaeth, 1906)
- Aethiopocassis garambana Borowiec & Świętojańska, 2018
- Aethiopocassis guineensis Borowiec & Świętojańska, 2018
- Aethiopocassis huilaensis Borowiec & Świętojańska, 2018
- Aethiopocassis imbuta (Spaeth, 1924)
- Aethiopocassis kasaiensis (Spaeth, 1933)
- Aethiopocassis kraatzi (Weise, 1898)
- Aethiopocassis longidoana Borowiec & Świętojańska, 2018
- Aethiopocassis pauli (Weise, 1898)
- Aethiopocassis plagipennis (Spaeth, 1916)
- Aethiopocassis planipennis (Spaeth, 1933)
- Aethiopocassis punctipennis (Spaeth, 1906)
- Aethiopocassis quadrioculata (Spaeth, 1916)
- Aethiopocassis revulsa (Spaeth, 1906)
- Aethiopocassis rhodesiana (Spaeth, 1924)
- Aethiopocassis scripta (Fabricius, 1798)
- Aethiopocassis sensualis (Spaeth, 1924)
- Aethiopocassis silphoides (Spaeth, 1906)
- Aethiopocassis sparsuta (Weise, 1904)
- Aethiopocassis steindachneri (Spaeth, 1916)
- Aethiopocassis stictica (Harold, 1879)
- Aethiopocassis suahelorum (Weise, 1899)
- Aethiopocassis suspiciosa (Weise, 1903)
- Aethiopocassis transvaalensis Borowiec & Świętojańska, 2018
- Aethiopocassis vigintimaculata (Thunberg, 1789)
