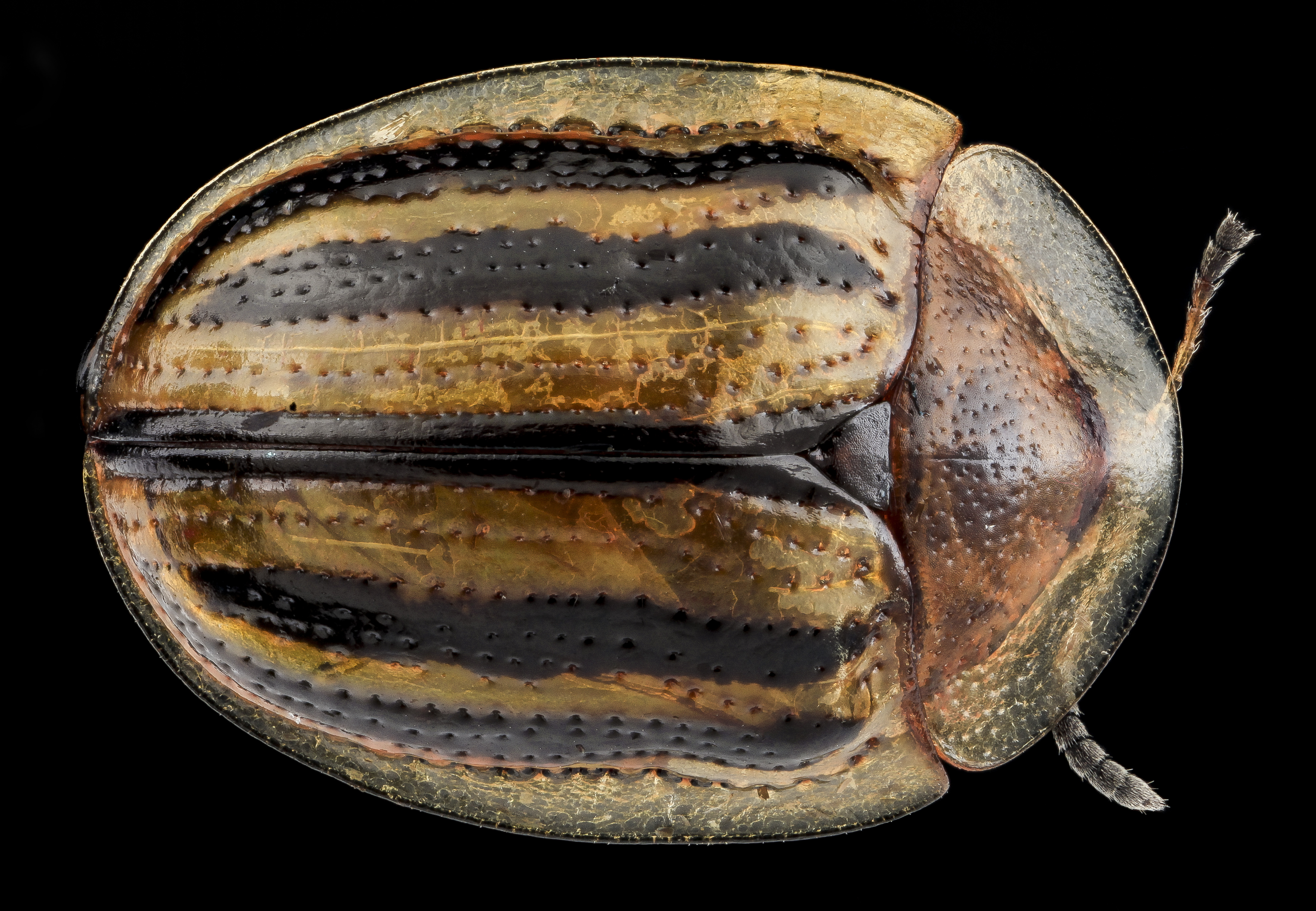
- Agroiconota bivittata

Scientific classification
- Kingdom: Animalia
- Phylum: Arthropoda
- Clade: Pancrustacea
- Class: Insecta
- Order: Coleoptera
- Suborder: Polyphaga
- Infraorder: Cucujiformia
- Family: Chrysomelidae
- Tribe: Cassidini
- Genus: Agroiconota; Spaeth, 1913

= Agroiconota =

Genus of beetles

Agroiconota is a genus of tortoise beetles in the family Chrysomelidae. There are more than 20 described species in Agroiconota.

== Species ==
These species belong to the genus Agroiconota:

- Agroiconota atromaculata Borowiec, 2005
- Agroiconota atropunctata Borowiec, 2005
- Agroiconota aulatipennis Spaeth, 1936
- Agroiconota bivittata (Say, 1827)
- Agroiconota carlobrivioi Borowiec, 2005
- Agroiconota conflagrata (Boheman, 1855)
- Agroiconota cubana Blake, 1970
- Agroiconota gibberosa (Boheman, 1855)
- Agroiconota gibbipennis Borowiec, 2005
- Agroiconota inedita (Boheman, 1855)
- Agroiconota judaica (Fabricius, 1781)
- Agroiconota lateripunctata Spaeth, 1936
- Agroiconota paraguayana Borowiec, 2005
- Agroiconota parellina Spaeth, 1937
- Agroiconota propinqua (Boheman, 1855)
- Agroiconota pullula (Boheman, 1855)
- Agroiconota punctipennis (Boheman, 1855)
- Agroiconota reimoseri Spaeth, 1936
- Agroiconota sanareensis Borowiec, 2005
- Agroiconota sodalis Spaeth, 1936
- Agroiconota stupidula (Boheman, 1855)
- Agroiconota subtriangularis Spaeth, 1936
- Agroiconota subvittata (Boheman, 1855)
- Agroiconota tristriata (Fabricius, 1792)
- Agroiconota vilis (Boheman, 1855)

== Selected former species ==
- Agroiconota urbanae Buzzi, 1996
- Agroiconota vittifera Spaeth, 1936
