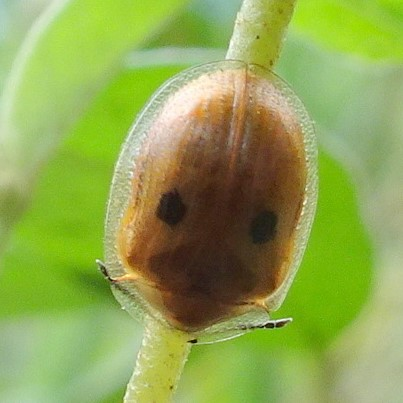

Scientific classification
- Kingdom: Animalia
- Phylum: Arthropoda
- Clade: Pancrustacea
- Class: Insecta
- Order: Coleoptera
- Suborder: Polyphaga
- Infraorder: Cucujiformia
- Family: Chrysomelidae
- Subfamily: Cassidinae
- Tribe: Cassidini
- Genus: Strongylocassis; Hincks, 1950
- Species: S. atripes

Binomial name
- Strongylocassis atripes (LeConte, 1859)

Synonyms
- Cassida atripes LeConte, 1859

= Strongylocassis =

Strongylocassis atripes

Genus of beetle

Strongylocassis is a genus of tortoise beetles in the family Chrysomelidae, containing a single species, S. atripes.
