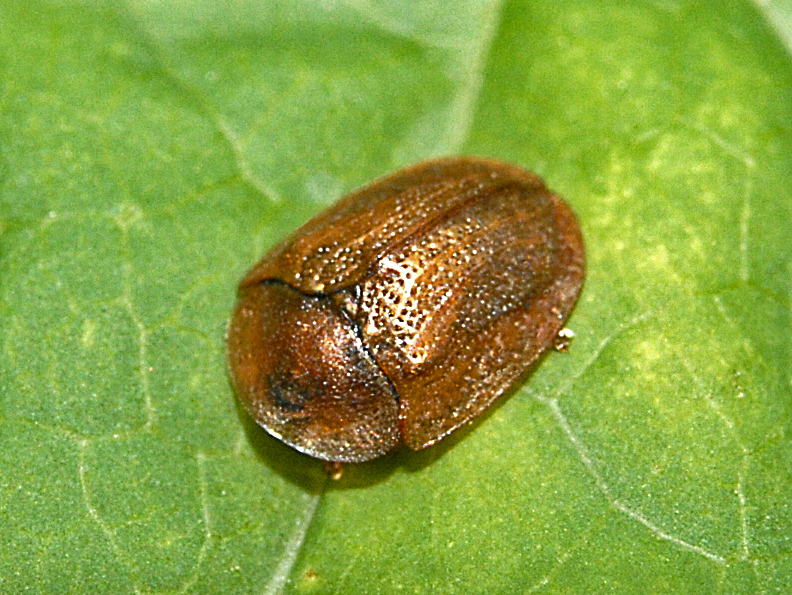
- Hypocassida subferruginea

Scientific classification
- Kingdom: Animalia
- Phylum: Arthropoda
- Clade: Pancrustacea
- Class: Insecta
- Order: Coleoptera
- Suborder: Polyphaga
- Infraorder: Cucujiformia
- Family: Chrysomelidae
- Tribe: Cassidini
- Genus: Hypocassida; Weise, 1893

= Hypocassida =

Genus of beetles

Hypocassida is a genus of leaf beetles belonging to the subfamily Cassidinae.

== Genera ==
- Hypocassida convexipennis Borowiec, 2000
- Hypocassida cornea (Marseul, 1868)
- Hypocassida grossepunctata Bordy, 2009
- Hypocassida meridionalis (Suffrian, 1844)
- Hypocassida subferruginea (Schrank, 1776
