= Bradycassis =

Scientific classification
- Kingdom: Animalia
- Phylum: Arthropoda
- Clade: Pancrustacea
- Class: Insecta
- Order: Coleoptera
- Suborder: Polyphaga
- Infraorder: Cucujiformia
- Family: Chrysomelidae
- Subfamily: Cassidinae
- Tribe: Cassidini
- Genus: Bradycassis; Spaeth, 1952

Genus of leaf beetles

Bradycassis is a genus of leaf beetles of the family Chrysomelidae.

== Species ==
- Bradycassis agroiconotoides Borowiec, 2005
- Bradycassis drewseni (Boheman, 1855)
- Bradycassis globosa (Boheman, 1855)
- Bradycassis globulipennis (Spaeth, 1926)
- Bradycassis immersa (Spaeth, 1909)
- Bradycassis matogrossoensis Swietojanska & Borowiec, 1996
- Bradycassis piagularis (Spaeth, 1926)
- Bradycassis romani (Spaeth, 1931)
- Bradycassis rudis (Spaeth, 1926)
- Bradycassis sandaricina (Boheman, 1862)
- Bradycassis sordescens (Spaeth, 1926)
- Bradycassis succosa (Spaeth, 1926)
