= Microctenochira stigmatica =

Scientific classification
- Kingdom: Animalia
- Phylum: Arthropoda
- Clade: Pancrustacea
- Class: Insecta
- Order: Coleoptera
- Suborder: Polyphaga
- Infraorder: Cucujiformia
- Family: Chrysomelidae
- Genus: Microctenochira
- Species: M. stigmatica

Binomial name
- Microctenochira stigmatica (Boheman, 1855)

Synonyms
- Coptocycla stigmatica Boheman, 1855; Ctenochira stigmatica ab. fenestrata Spaeth, 1926

Species of beetle

Microctenochira stigmatica is a species of beetle of the family Chrysomelidae. It is found in Brazil (Bahia, Ceara, Paraná, Rio de Janeiro, Rio Grande do Sul, Santa Catarina, Pernambuco).
