= Agroiconota judaica =

Scientific classification
- Kingdom: Animalia
- Phylum: Arthropoda
- Clade: Pancrustacea
- Class: Insecta
- Order: Coleoptera
- Suborder: Polyphaga
- Infraorder: Cucujiformia
- Family: Chrysomelidae
- Genus: Agroiconota
- Species: A. judaica

Binomial name
- Agroiconota judaica (Fabricius, 1781)

Synonyms
- Cassida judaica Fabricius, 1781; Coplocycla judaica var. operosa Boheman, 1855

Species of beetle

Agroiconota judaica is a species of beetle of the family Chrysomelidae. It is found in Bolivia, Brazil (Amazonas, Distrito Federal, Maranhão, Mato Grosso, Pará, Pernambuco, Rio de Janeiro, Rio Grande do Sul, Rondônia), Colombia, Costa Rica, Ecuador, French Guiana, Guyana, Nicaragua, Panama, Paraguay, Peru, Suriname, Trinidad and Venezuela.

== Life history ==
The recorded host plants are Merremia aegyptia and Merremia umbellata.
