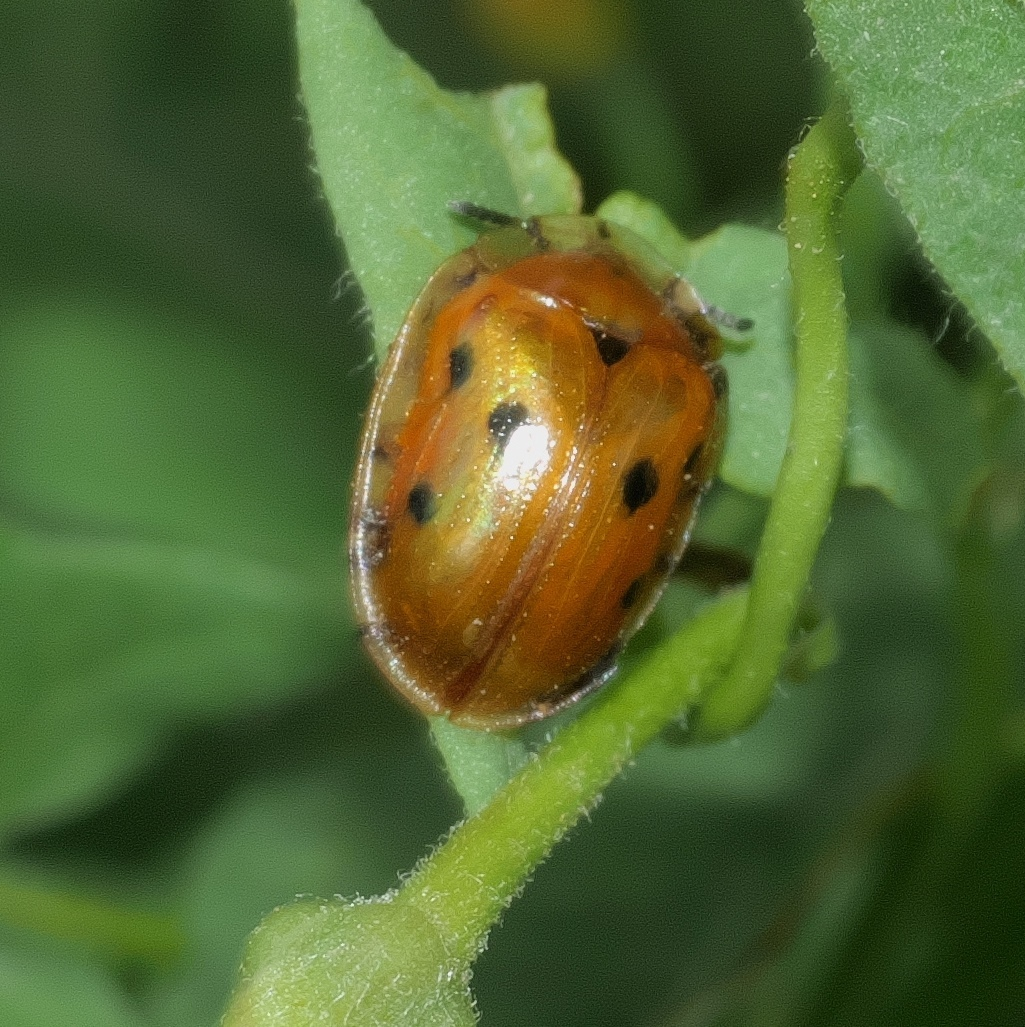
- Jonthonota nigripes, Oklahoma

Scientific classification
- Kingdom: Animalia
- Phylum: Arthropoda
- Clade: Pancrustacea
- Class: Insecta
- Order: Coleoptera
- Suborder: Polyphaga
- Infraorder: Cucujiformia
- Family: Chrysomelidae
- Genus: Jonthonota
- Species: J. nigripes

Binomial name
- Jonthonota nigripes (Olivier, 1790)

= Jonthonota nigripes =

Species of beetle

Jonthonota nigripes, the blacklegged tortoise beetle, is a species of tortoise beetle in the family Chrysomelidae. It is found in Central America and North America.
