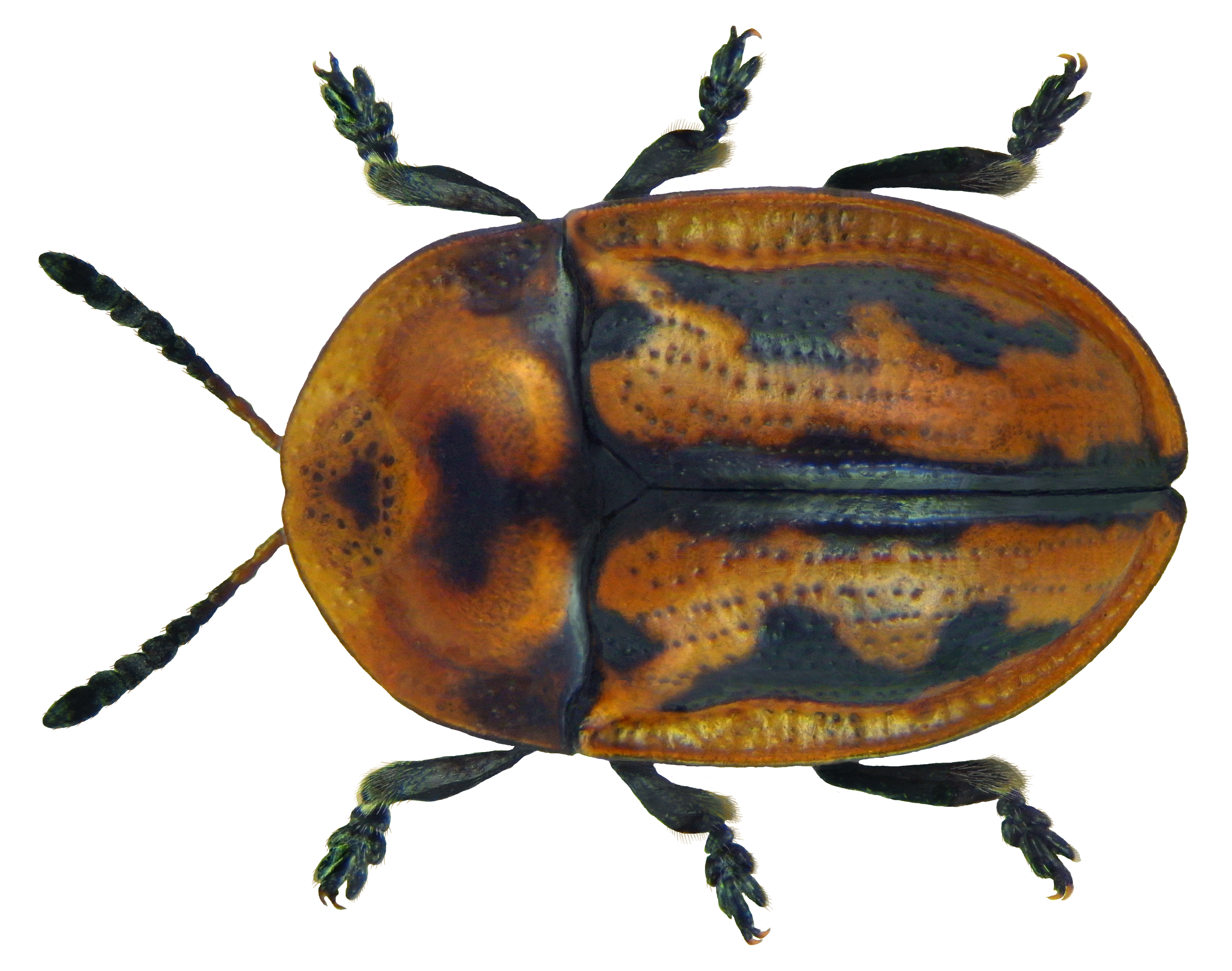

Scientific classification
- Kingdom: Animalia
- Phylum: Arthropoda
- Clade: Pancrustacea
- Class: Insecta
- Order: Coleoptera
- Suborder: Polyphaga
- Infraorder: Cucujiformia
- Family: Chrysomelidae
- Tribe: Cassidini
- Genus: Pilemostoma; Desbrochers, 1891
- Species: P. fastuosa

Binomial name
- Pilemostoma fastuosa (Schaller, 1783)

= Pilemostoma =

Pilemostoma fastuosa

Genus of beetles

Pilemostoma is a genus of beetles belonging to the family Chrysomelidae. The genus is monotypic, being represented by the single species Pilemostoma fastuosa which is found in Europe. The specific epithet is also sometimes spelled "fastuosum".
