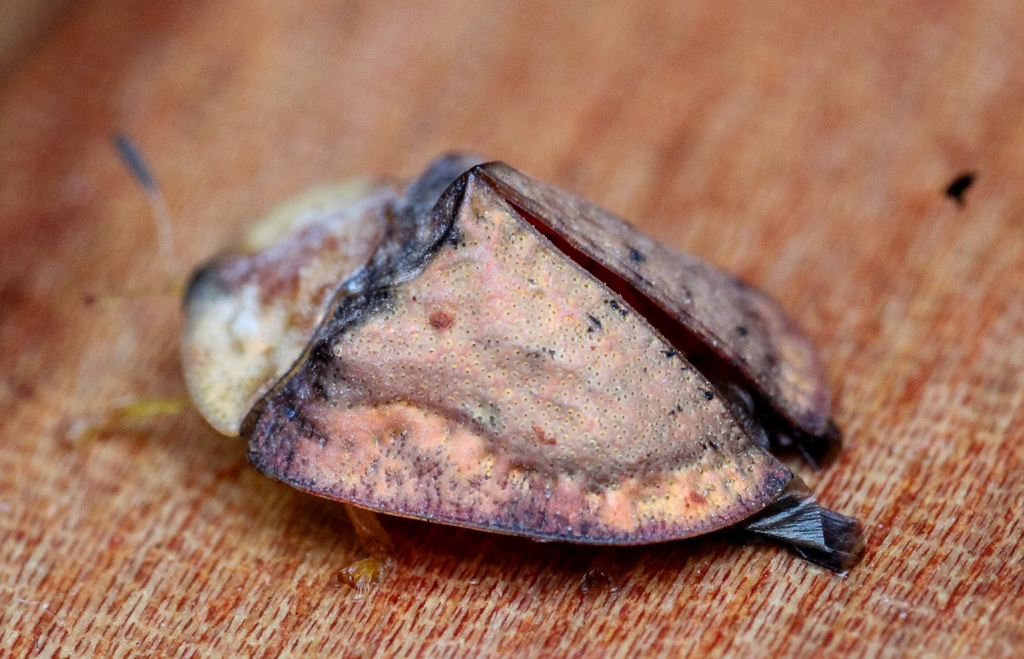
- Acrocassis gibbipennis

Scientific classification
- Kingdom: Animalia
- Phylum: Arthropoda
- Clade: Pancrustacea
- Class: Insecta
- Order: Coleoptera
- Suborder: Polyphaga
- Infraorder: Cucujiformia
- Family: Chrysomelidae
- Subfamily: Cassidinae
- Tribe: Cassidini
- Genus: Acrocassis; Spaeth, 1922

= Acrocassis =

Genus of leaf beetles

Acrocassis is a genus of leaf beetles of the family Chrysomelidae.

== Species ==
- Acrocassis
  - Acrocassis flavescens (Weise, 1904)
  - Acrocassis gibbipennis (Boheman, 1854)
  - Acrocassis intermedia Borowiec, 2002
  - Acrocassis roseomarginata (Boheman, 1854)
  - Acrocassis rufula (Thomson, 1858)
  - Acrocassis sudanensis Spaeth, 1929
  - Acrocassis undulatipennis Borowiec, 2002
  - Acrocassis zavattarii Spaeth, 1938
- Subgenus Bassamia Spaeth, 1924
  - Acrocassis paeminosa (Boheman, 1856)
