= Metrionella connata =

Scientific classification
- Kingdom: Animalia
- Phylum: Arthropoda
- Clade: Pancrustacea
- Class: Insecta
- Order: Coleoptera
- Suborder: Polyphaga
- Infraorder: Cucujiformia
- Family: Chrysomelidae
- Genus: Metrionella
- Species: M. connata

Binomial name
- Metrionella connata Spaeth, 1932

Species of beetle

Metrionella connata is a species of beetle of the family Chrysomelidae. It is found in Brazil (Bahia, Pernambuco).
