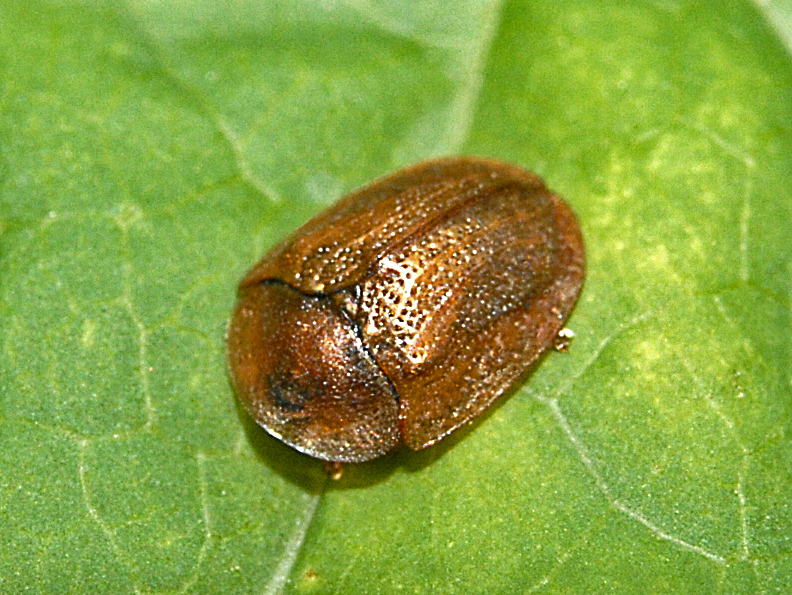
- Hypocassida subferruginea

Scientific classification
- Kingdom: Animalia
- Phylum: Arthropoda
- Clade: Pancrustacea
- Class: Insecta
- Order: Coleoptera
- Suborder: Polyphaga
- Infraorder: Cucujiformia
- Family: Chrysomelidae
- Genus: Hypocassida
- Species: H. subferruginea

Binomial name
- Hypocassida subferruginea (Schrank, 1776)

Synonyms
- Cassida subferruginea (Schrank, 1776)

= Hypocassida subferruginea =

Species of beetle

Hypocassida subferruginea is a species of leaf beetles belonging to the family Chrysomelidae.

== Description ==
Hypocassida subferruginea can reach a length of 4.5–6.3 millimetres (0.18–0.25 in). The basic colour of the body is yellowish or reddish-brown, with light metallic reflection and blackish basal margin of the pronotum.

== Ecology ==
Main larval host plants are in the family Convolvulaceae, especially field bindweed (Convolvulus arvensis) and larger bindweed (C. sepium), but these polyphagous larvae feed also on common yarrow (Achillea millefolium). Adults occur from April to September.

== Distribution and habitat ==
This species is present in most of European countries, in the eastern Palearctic realm, in the Near East, and in North Africa. It mainly occurs in field margins and wetlands.
