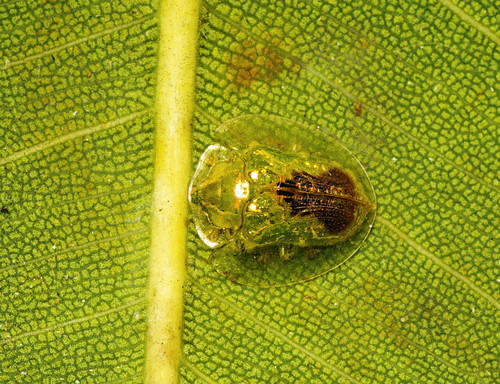

Scientific classification
- Kingdom: Animalia
- Phylum: Arthropoda
- Clade: Pancrustacea
- Class: Insecta
- Order: Coleoptera
- Suborder: Polyphaga
- Infraorder: Cucujiformia
- Family: Chrysomelidae
- Subfamily: Cassidinae
- Tribe: Cassidini
- Genus: Austropsecadia; Hincks, 1950
- Species: A. chlorina

Binomial name
- Austropsecadia chlorina (Weise, 1899)

Synonyms
- Psecas Weise, 1899; Psecas chlorina Weise, 1899; Psecadia Weise, 1900; Psecadia chlorina

= Austropsecadia =

Genus of beetles

Austropsecadia is a genus of leaf beetles in the family Chrysomelidae. It is monotypic, being represented by the single species, Austropsecadia chlorina, which is found in Australia (New South Wales, Queensland).
