= Plagiometriona microcera =

Scientific classification
- Kingdom: Animalia
- Phylum: Arthropoda
- Clade: Pancrustacea
- Class: Insecta
- Order: Coleoptera
- Suborder: Polyphaga
- Infraorder: Cucujiformia
- Family: Chrysomelidae
- Genus: Plagiometriona
- Species: P. microcera

Binomial name
- Plagiometriona microcera (Boheman, 1855)

Synonyms
- Coptocycla microcera Boheman, 1855

Species of beetle

Plagiometriona microcera is a species of beetle of the family Chrysomelidae. It is found in Brazil (Bahia, Pernambuco).
