= Agroiconota inedita =

Scientific classification
- Kingdom: Animalia
- Phylum: Arthropoda
- Clade: Pancrustacea
- Class: Insecta
- Order: Coleoptera
- Suborder: Polyphaga
- Infraorder: Cucujiformia
- Family: Chrysomelidae
- Genus: Agroiconota
- Species: A. inedita

Binomial name
- Agroiconota inedita (Boheman, 1855)

Synonyms
- Coptocycla inedita Boheman, 1855

Species of beetle

Agroiconota inedita is a species of beetle of the family Chrysomelidae. It is found in Argentina, Bolivia, Brazil (Mato Grosso, Minas Gerais, Pará, Paraná, Pernambuco, Rio de Janeiro, Santa Catarina, São Paulo) and Paraguay.

== Life history ==
The recorded host plants are Ipomoea batatas and Ipomoea purpurea.
