= Agroiconota stupidula =

Scientific classification
- Kingdom: Animalia
- Phylum: Arthropoda
- Clade: Pancrustacea
- Class: Insecta
- Order: Coleoptera
- Suborder: Polyphaga
- Infraorder: Cucujiformia
- Family: Chrysomelidae
- Genus: Agroiconota
- Species: A. stupidula

Binomial name
- Agroiconota stupidula (Boheman, 1855)

Synonyms
- Coptocycla stupidula Boheman, 1855; Agroiconota stupidula fulviventris Spaeth, 1936

Species of beetle

Agroiconota stupidula is a species of beetle of the family Chrysomelidae. It is found in Argentina, Bolivia, Brazil (Ceará, Pará, Paraíba, Pernambuco, Piauí, Mato Grosso, Minas Gerais, Rio Grande do Norte, Rio Grande do Sul), Paraguay and Venezuela.
