= Charidotis marginella =

Scientific classification
- Kingdom: Animalia
- Phylum: Arthropoda
- Clade: Pancrustacea
- Class: Insecta
- Order: Coleoptera
- Suborder: Polyphaga
- Infraorder: Cucujiformia
- Family: Chrysomelidae
- Genus: Charidotis
- Species: C. marginella

Binomial name
- Charidotis marginella (Fabricius, 1775)

Synonyms
- Cassida marginella Fabricius, 1775

Species of beetle

Charidotis marginella is a species of beetle of the family Chrysomelidae. It is found in Argentina, Bolivia, Brazil (Mato Grosso, Mato Grosso do Sul, Paraná, Rio Grande do Sul, Santa Catarina, Pernambuco, São Paulo) and Paraguay.
