= Charidotis ambigua =

Scientific classification
- Kingdom: Animalia
- Phylum: Arthropoda
- Clade: Pancrustacea
- Class: Insecta
- Order: Coleoptera
- Suborder: Polyphaga
- Infraorder: Cucujiformia
- Family: Chrysomelidae
- Genus: Charidotis
- Species: C. ambigua

Binomial name
- Charidotis ambigua Boheman, 1855

Species of beetle

Charidotis ambigua is a species of beetle of the family Chrysomelidae. It is found in Brazil (Amazonas, Pará, Pernambuco), Ecuador, French Guiana and Suriname.
