= Parorectis sublaevis =

Scientific classification
- Kingdom: Animalia
- Phylum: Arthropoda
- Class: Insecta
- Order: Coleoptera
- Suborder: Polyphaga
- Infraorder: Cucujiformia
- Family: Chrysomelidae
- Genus: Parorectis
- Species: P. sublaevis

Binomial name
- Parorectis sublaevis (Barber, 1946)

Species of beetle

Parorectis sublaevis is a species of tortoise beetle in the family Chrysomelidae. It is found in Central America and North America.
