= Cteisella ramosa =

Scientific classification
- Kingdom: Animalia
- Phylum: Arthropoda
- Clade: Pancrustacea
- Class: Insecta
- Order: Coleoptera
- Suborder: Polyphaga
- Infraorder: Cucujiformia
- Family: Chrysomelidae
- Genus: Cteisella
- Species: C. ramosa

Binomial name
- Cteisella ramosa Spaeth, 1926

Species of beetle

Cteisella ramosa is a species of beetle of the family Chrysomelidae. It is found in Argentina, Brazil (Mato Grosso do Sul, Rio de Janeiro, Rio Grande do Sul, Santa Catarina, São Paulo, Pernambuco) and Peru.
