= Microctenochira quadrata =

Scientific classification
- Kingdom: Animalia
- Phylum: Arthropoda
- Clade: Pancrustacea
- Class: Insecta
- Order: Coleoptera
- Suborder: Polyphaga
- Infraorder: Cucujiformia
- Family: Chrysomelidae
- Genus: Microctenochira
- Species: M. quadrata

Binomial name
- Microctenochira quadrata (De Geer, 1775)

Synonyms
- Cassida quadrata De Geer, 1775; Coplocycla aprica Boheman, 1855

Species of beetle

Microctenochira quadrata is a species of beetle of the family Chrysomelidae. It is found in Brazil (Goiás, Mato Grosso, Minas Gerais, Pará, Santa Catarina, São Paulo, Pernambuco), Colombia, French Guiana, Guyana, Panama, Paraguay, Suriname, Trinidad and Tobago and Venezuela.
