= Opacinota =

Scientific classification
- Kingdom: Animalia
- Phylum: Arthropoda
- Clade: Pancrustacea
- Class: Insecta
- Order: Coleoptera
- Suborder: Polyphaga
- Infraorder: Cucujiformia
- Family: Chrysomelidae
- Subfamily: Cassidinae
- Tribe: Cassidini
- Genus: Opacinota; E. Riley, 1986
- Species: O. bisignata

Binomial name
- Opacinota bisignata (Boheman, 1855)

Synonyms
- Coptocycla bisignata Boheman, 1855

Genus of beetle

Opacinota is a genus of tortoise beetles in the family Chrysomelidae, containing a single species, O. bisignata.
