= Charidotis incincta =

Scientific classification
- Kingdom: Animalia
- Phylum: Arthropoda
- Clade: Pancrustacea
- Class: Insecta
- Order: Coleoptera
- Suborder: Polyphaga
- Infraorder: Cucujiformia
- Family: Chrysomelidae
- Genus: Charidotis
- Species: C. incincta

Binomial name
- Charidotis incincta (Boheman, 1862)

Synonyms
- Coptocycla incincta Boheman, 1862

Species of beetle

Charidotis incincta is a species of beetle of the family Chrysomelidae. It is found in Bolivia, Brazil (Amazonas, Mato Grosso, Pernambuco), Costa Rica, Panama, Peru and Venezuela.
