= Bradycassis romani =

Scientific classification
- Kingdom: Animalia
- Phylum: Arthropoda
- Clade: Pancrustacea
- Class: Insecta
- Order: Coleoptera
- Suborder: Polyphaga
- Infraorder: Cucujiformia
- Family: Chrysomelidae
- Genus: Bradycassis
- Species: B. romani

Binomial name
- Bradycassis romani (Spaeth, 1931)

Synonyms
- Metriona romani Spaeth, 1931

Species of beetle

Bradycassis romani is a species of beetle of the family Chrysomelidae. It is found in Brazil (Bahia, Mato Grosso, Pernambuco).
