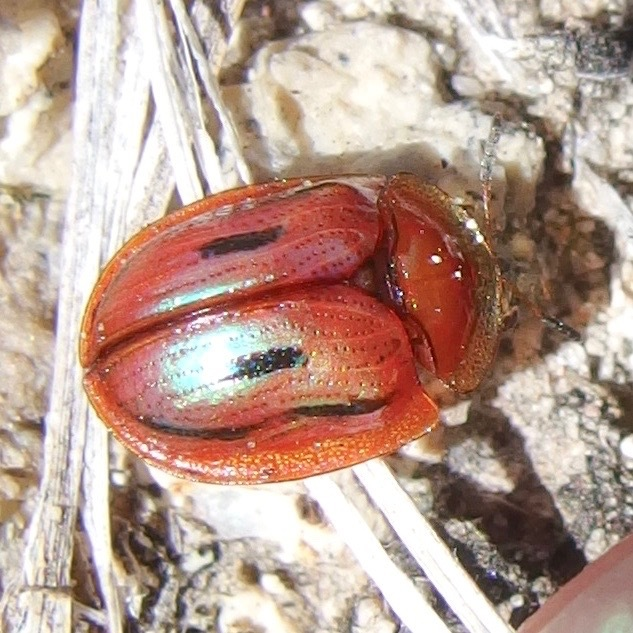
- Jonthonota mexicana, Arizona

Scientific classification
- Kingdom: Animalia
- Phylum: Arthropoda
- Class: Insecta
- Order: Coleoptera
- Suborder: Polyphaga
- Infraorder: Cucujiformia
- Family: Chrysomelidae
- Genus: Jonthonota
- Species: J. mexicana

Binomial name
- Jonthonota mexicana (Champion, 1894)

= Jonthonota mexicana =

Species of beetle

Jonthonota mexicana is a species of tortoise beetle in the family Chrysomelidae. It is found in Central America and North America.
