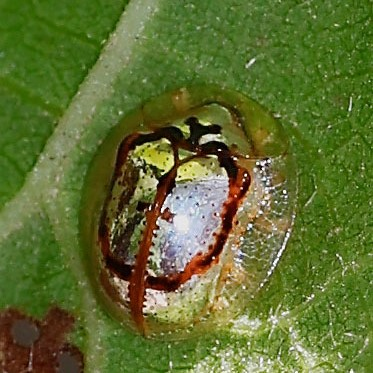

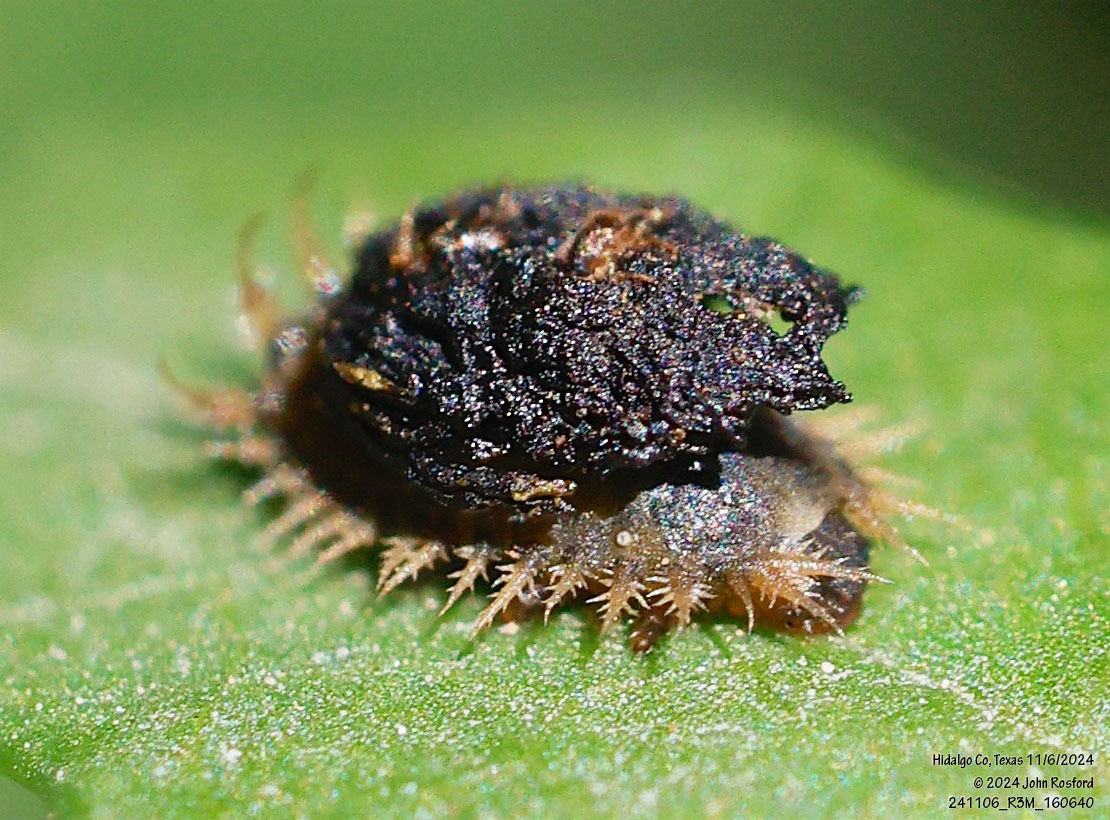
- Adult (top) and larva (bottom)

Scientific classification
- Kingdom: Animalia
- Phylum: Arthropoda
- Class: Insecta
- Order: Coleoptera
- Suborder: Polyphaga
- Infraorder: Cucujiformia
- Family: Chrysomelidae
- Genus: Microctenochira
- Species: M. bonvouloiri

Binomial name
- Microctenochira bonvouloiri (Boheman, 1855)

= Microctenochira bonvouloiri =

Species of beetle

Microctenochira bonvouloiri is a species of tortoise beetle in the family Chrysomelidae. It is found in Central America and North America.
