= Charidotis circumducta =

Scientific classification
- Kingdom: Animalia
- Phylum: Arthropoda
- Clade: Pancrustacea
- Class: Insecta
- Order: Coleoptera
- Suborder: Polyphaga
- Infraorder: Cucujiformia
- Family: Chrysomelidae
- Genus: Charidotis
- Species: C. circumducta

Binomial name
- Charidotis circumducta (Boheman, 1855)

Synonyms
- Coptocycla circumducta Boheman, 1855

Species of beetle

Charidotis circumducta is a species of beetle of the family Chrysomelidae. It is found in Brazil (Rio de Janeiro, Rio Grande do Sul, Santa Catarina, São Paulo, Pernambuco).
