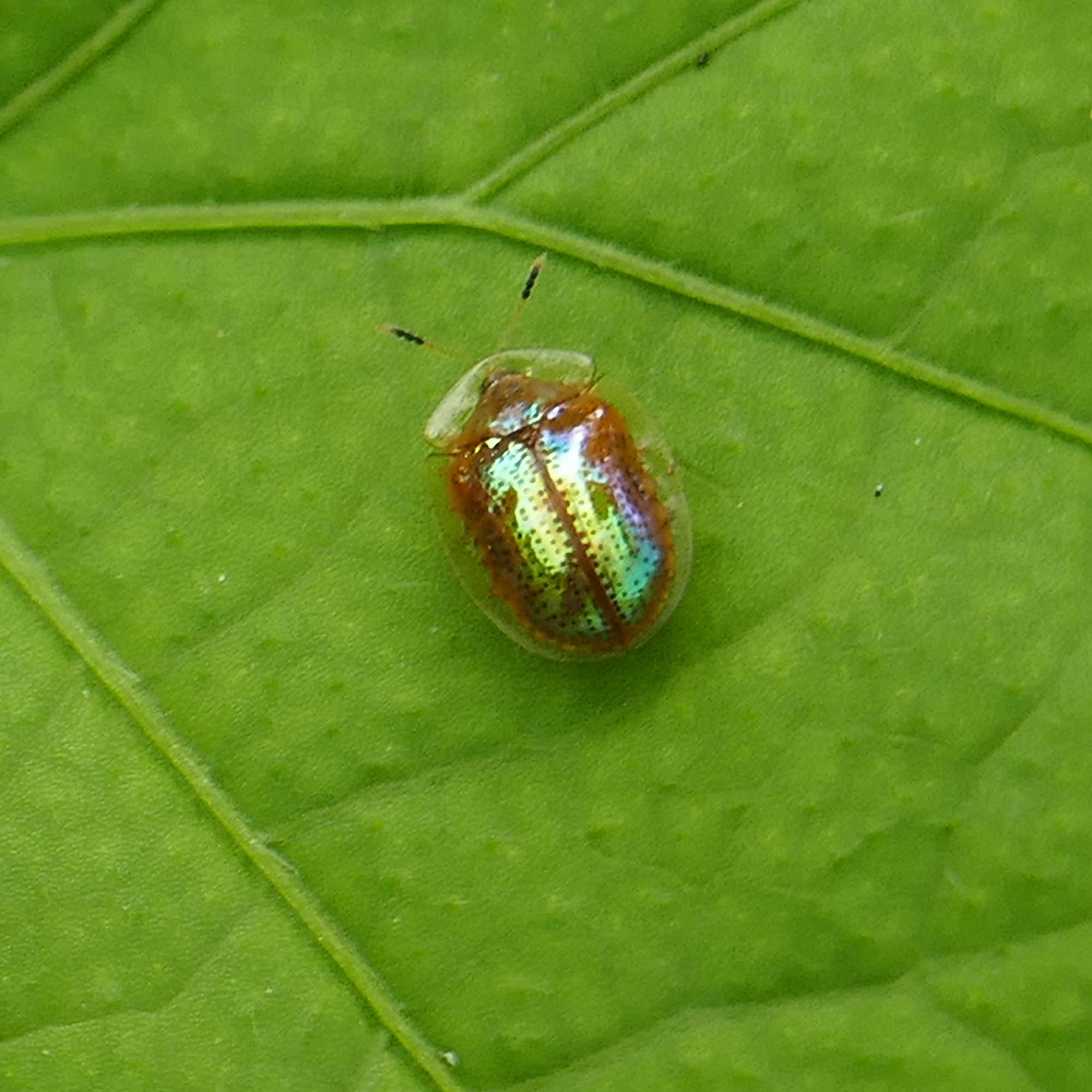

Scientific classification
- Kingdom: Animalia
- Phylum: Arthropoda
- Class: Insecta
- Order: Coleoptera
- Suborder: Polyphaga
- Infraorder: Cucujiformia
- Family: Chrysomelidae
- Genus: Metrionella
- Species: M. bilimeki

Binomial name
- Metrionella bilimeki (Spaeth, 1932)

= Metrionella bilimeki =

Species of beetle

Metrionella bilimeki is a species of tortoise beetle in the family Chrysomelidae.
