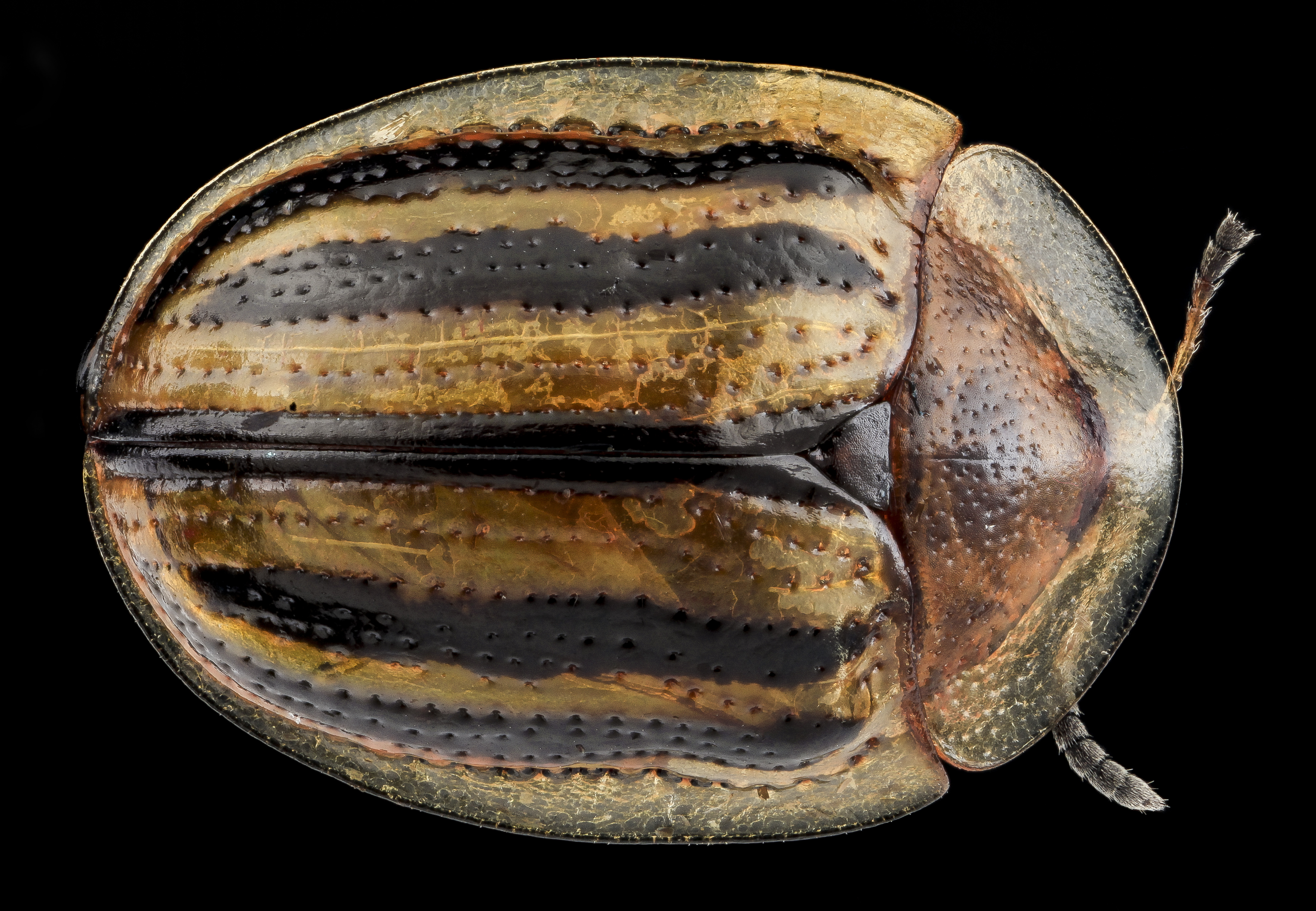

Scientific classification
- Kingdom: Animalia
- Phylum: Arthropoda
- Class: Insecta
- Order: Coleoptera
- Suborder: Polyphaga
- Infraorder: Cucujiformia
- Family: Chrysomelidae
- Genus: Agroiconota
- Species: A. bivittata

Binomial name
- Agroiconota bivittata (Say, 1827)

= Agroiconota bivittata =

Species of beetle

Agroiconota bivittata is a species of tortoise beetle in the family Chrysomelidae. It is found in Central America and North America.
