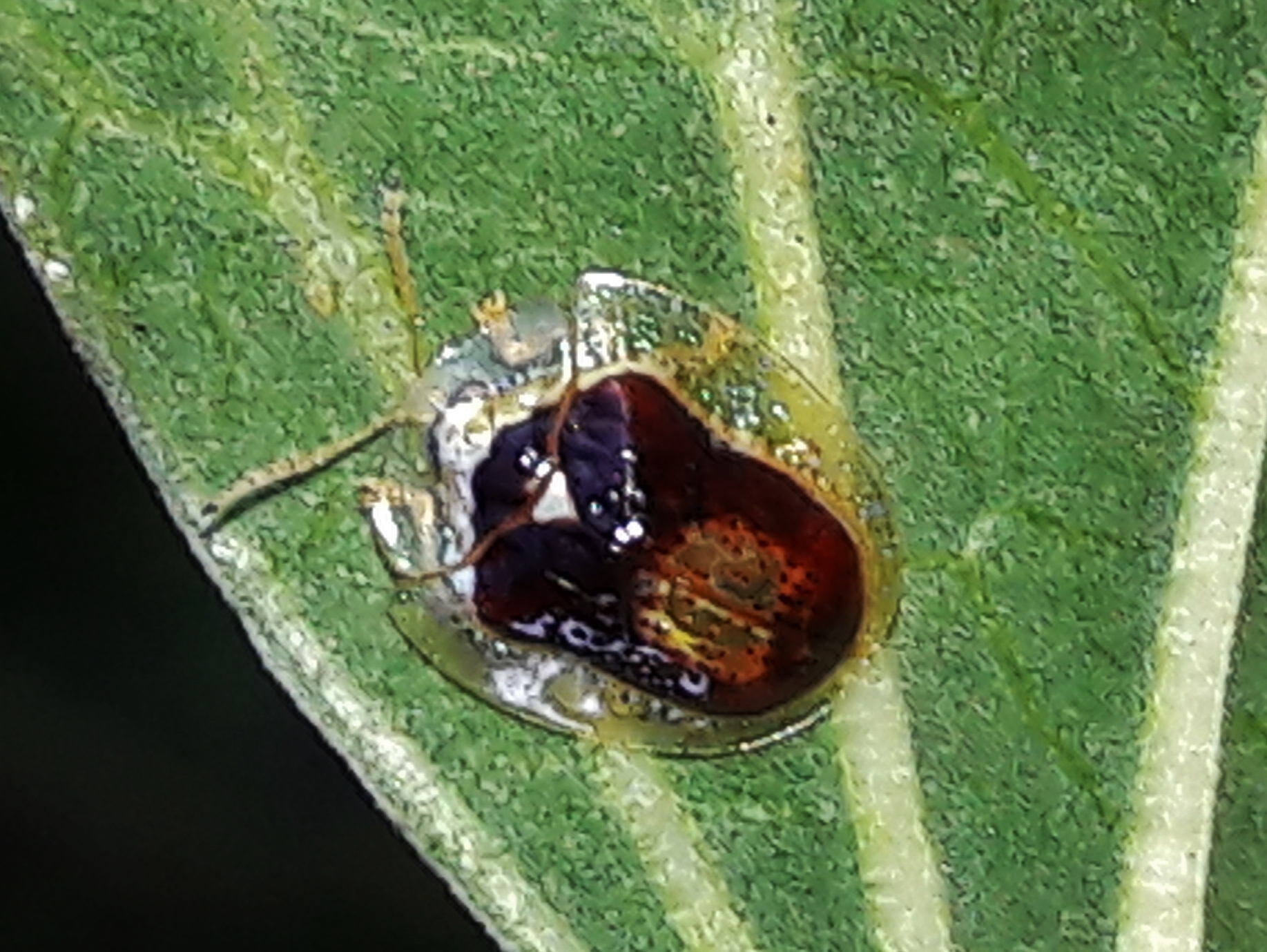

Scientific classification
- Kingdom: Animalia
- Phylum: Arthropoda
- Clade: Pancrustacea
- Class: Insecta
- Order: Coleoptera
- Suborder: Polyphaga
- Infraorder: Cucujiformia
- Family: Chrysomelidae
- Genus: Microctenochira
- Species: M. trepida

Binomial name
- Microctenochira trepida (Boheman, 1855)

Synonyms
- Coptocycla trepida Boheman, 1855

= Microctenochira trepida =

Species of beetle

Microctenochira trepida is a species of leaf beetle from the subfamily Cassidinae. It is known from Brazil (Bahia, Mato Grosso, Pernambuco) and Trinidad. The species was first described by Carl Henrik Boheman in 1855.
