= Erepsocassis =

Scientific classification
- Kingdom: Animalia
- Phylum: Arthropoda
- Clade: Pancrustacea
- Class: Insecta
- Order: Coleoptera
- Suborder: Polyphaga
- Infraorder: Cucujiformia
- Family: Chrysomelidae
- Subfamily: Cassidinae
- Tribe: Cassidini
- Genus: Erepsocassis; Spaeth, 1936
- Species: E. rubella

Binomial name
- Erepsocassis rubella (Boheman, 1862)

Synonyms
- Coptocycla rubella Boheman, 1862; Metriona marginepunctata Schaeffer, 1925

Genus of beetle

Erepsocassis is a genus of tortoise beetles in the family Chrysomelidae, containing a single species, E. rubella, which has been recorded from Alabama.
