= Cteisella =

- Cteisella confusa

Scientific classification
- Kingdom: Animalia
- Phylum: Arthropoda
- Clade: Pancrustacea
- Class: Insecta
- Order: Coleoptera
- Suborder: Polyphaga
- Infraorder: Cucujiformia
- Family: Chrysomelidae
- Subfamily: Cassidinae
- Tribe: Cassidini
- Genus: Cteisella; Weise, 1896

Genus of leaf beetles

Cteisella is a genus of leaf beetles of the family Chrysomelidae.

== Species ==
- Cteisella amicta (Boheman, 1855)
- Cteisella centropunctata (Boheman, 1855)
- Cteisella confusa (Boheman, 1855)
- Cteisella divalis Spaeth, 1926
- Cteisella egens Spaeth, 1910
- Cteisella flava Borowiec, 2004
- Cteisella flavocincta (Boheman, 1855)
- Cteisella gentilis Spaeth, 1926
- Cteisella gounellei Spaeth, 1932
- Cteisella guttigera (Boheman, 1855)
- Cteisella imitatrix Spaeth, 1901
- Cteisella impura (Boheman, 1855)
- Cteisella indecorata (Boheman, 1855)
- Cteisella intricata Spaeth, 1926
- Cteisella magica (Boheman, 1855)
- Cteisella ramosa Spaeth, 1926
- Cteisella rotalis (Boheman, 1855)
- Cteisella signatifera (Boheman, 1855)
- Cteisella tama Spaeth, 1926
- Cteisella virescens (Boheman, 1855)
- Cteisella zonata (Boheman, 1855)
