= Microctenochira optata =

Scientific classification
- Kingdom: Animalia
- Phylum: Arthropoda
- Clade: Pancrustacea
- Class: Insecta
- Order: Coleoptera
- Suborder: Polyphaga
- Infraorder: Cucujiformia
- Family: Chrysomelidae
- Genus: Microctenochira
- Species: M. optata

Binomial name
- Microctenochira optata (Boheman, 1855)

Synonyms
- Coptocycla optata Boheman, 1855; Coplocycla derosa Boheman, 1855; Coptocycla dolorosa Boheman, 1855; Coptocycla peruviana Kirsch, 1876

Species of beetle

Microctenochira optata is a species of beetle of the family Chrysomelidae. It is found in Argentina, Bolivia, Brazil (Alagoas, Bahia, Goiás, Mato Grosso, Minas Gerais, Pará, Paraná, Rio de Janeiro, Rio Grande do Sul, Santa Catarina, São Paulo, Pernambuco), French Guiana, Paraguay and Peru.

== Life history ==
The recorded host plant is Ipomoea batatas.
