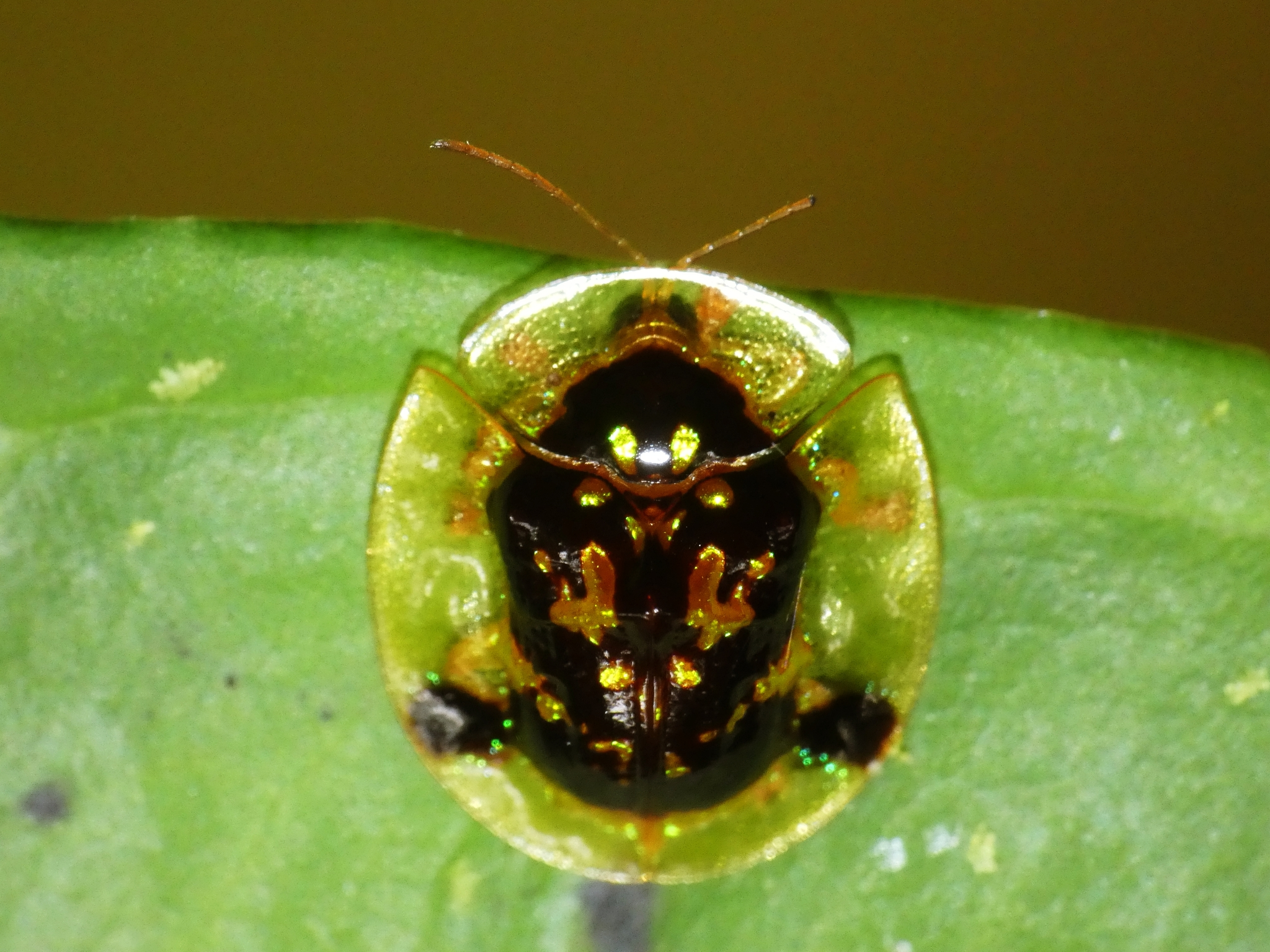
- Thlaspidosoma dohrni

Scientific classification
- Kingdom: Animalia
- Phylum: Arthropoda
- Clade: Pancrustacea
- Class: Insecta
- Order: Coleoptera
- Suborder: Polyphaga
- Infraorder: Cucujiformia
- Family: Chrysomelidae
- Subfamily: Cassidinae
- Tribe: Cassidini
- Genus: Thlaspidosoma; Spaeth, 1901

= Thlaspidosoma =

Genus of leaf beetles

Thlaspidosoma is a genus of beetles belonging to the family Chrysomelidae.

== Species ==
- Thlaspidosoma assamense Spaeth, 1926
- Thlaspidosoma breve Chen & Zia, 1964
- Thlaspidosoma celebense Spaeth, 1933
- Thlaspidosoma dohrni Spaeth, 1901
- Thlaspidosoma fallaciosum Spaeth, 1901
- Thlaspidosoma gracilicorne Spaeth, 1915
- Thlaspidosoma horsfieldi (Boheman, 1855)
- Thlaspidosoma philippinum (Spaeth, 1916)
- Thlaspidosoma rizalense Spaeth, 1933
