= Ctenocharidotis =

Scientific classification
- Kingdom: Animalia
- Phylum: Arthropoda
- Clade: Pancrustacea
- Class: Insecta
- Order: Coleoptera
- Suborder: Polyphaga
- Infraorder: Cucujiformia
- Family: Chrysomelidae
- Subfamily: Cassidinae
- Tribe: Cassidini
- Genus: Ctenocharidotis; Spaeth, 1926

Genus of leaf beetles

Ctenocharidotis is a genus of leaf beetles of the family Chrysomelidae.

== Species ==
- Ctenocharidotis beata (Spaeth, 1926)
- Ctenocharidotis briseis (Boheman, 1862)
- Ctenocharidotis chlorion (Spaeth, 1926)
- Ctenocharidotis crispata (Boheman, 1855)
- Ctenocharidotis nobilitata (Boheman, 1855)
- Ctenocharidotis ornatipennis (Spaeth, 1926)
- Ctenocharidotis roseopicta (Boheman, 1855)
- Ctenocharidotis subplagiata (Boheman, 1855)
