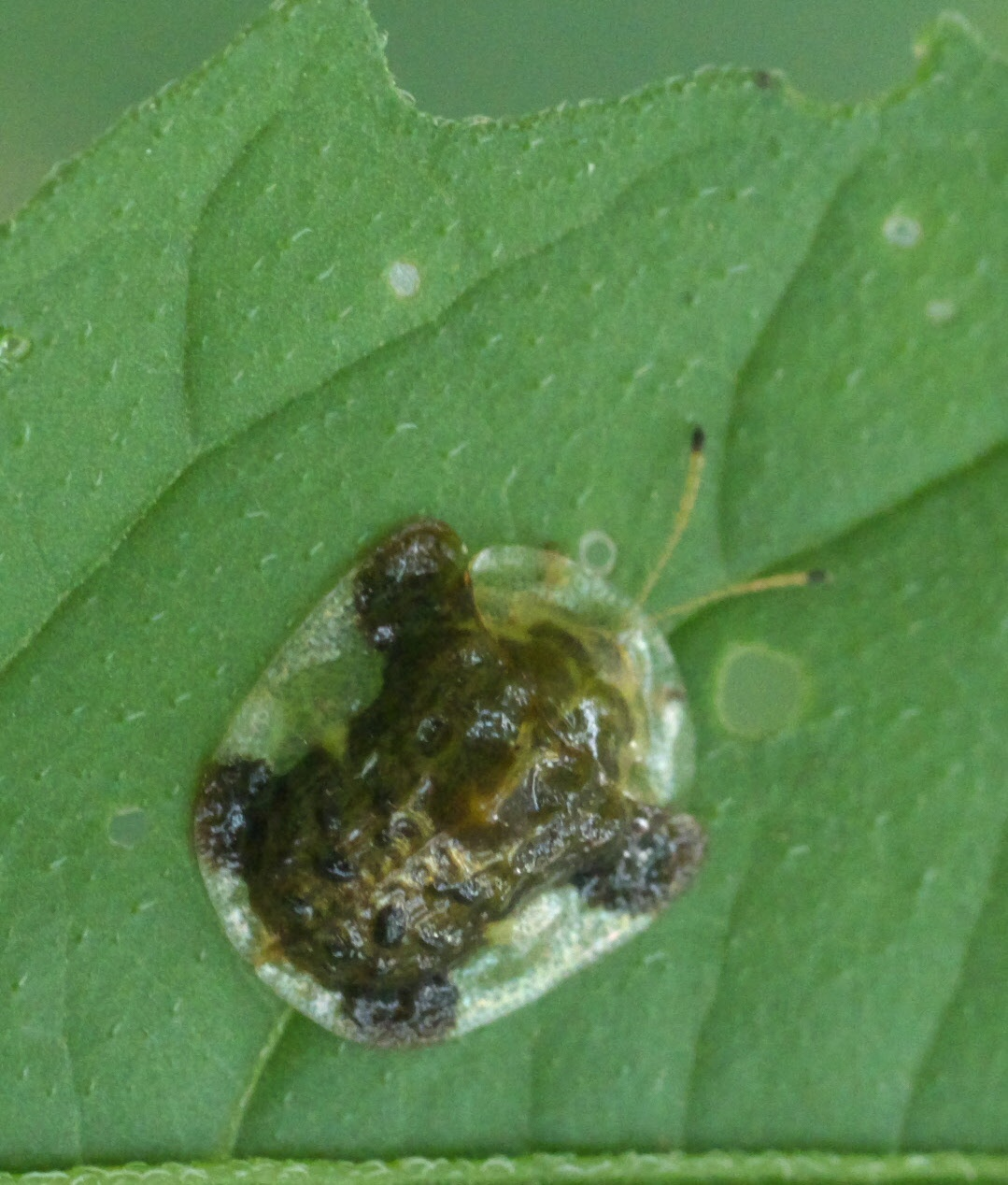
- Plagiometriona clavata

Scientific classification
- Kingdom: Animalia
- Phylum: Arthropoda
- Clade: Pancrustacea
- Class: Insecta
- Order: Coleoptera
- Suborder: Polyphaga
- Infraorder: Cucujiformia
- Family: Chrysomelidae
- Subfamily: Cassidinae
- Tribe: Cassidini
- Genus: Plagiometriona; Spaeth, 1899

Synonyms
- Parametriona Spaeth, 1937; Helocassis Spaeth, 1952 (disputed)

= Plagiometriona =

Genus of beetles

Plagiometriona is a genus of tortoise beetles in the family Chrysomelidae. Several species occurring in Central and North America have sometimes been classified under a separate genus, Helocassis, but North American researchers continue to treat that name as a junior synonym.

== Species ==
- Plagiometriona ambigena (Boheman, 1855)
- Plagiometriona amplexa (Erichson, 1847)
- Plagiometriona approximans Spaeth, 1937
- Plagiometriona aucta (Boheman, 1855)
- Plagiometriona baeri Spaeth, 1937
- Plagiometriona bisbimaculata (Boheman, 1855)
- Plagiometriona bistriguttata (Boheman, 1855)
- Plagiometriona boliviana Spaeth, 1912
- Plagiometriona boschmai Spaeth, 1937
- Plagiometriona bremei (Boheman, 1855)
- Plagiometriona buckleyi Spaeth, 1937
- Plagiometriona buqueti (Boheman, 1855)
- Plagiometriona centralis (Boheman, 1855)
- Plagiometriona circulifera Spaeth, 1937
- Plagiometriona clandestina (Boheman, 1855)
- Plagiometriona clarki (Boheman, 1862)
- Plagiometriona coccinelloides (Boheman, 1855)
- Plagiometriona columbica Spaeth, 1937
- Plagiometriona commixta Spaeth, 1937
- Plagiometriona congregata (Boheman, 1855)
- Plagiometriona constricta (Boheman, 1855)
- Plagiometriona costaricensis Borowiec, 2001
- Plagiometriona deyrollei (Boheman, 1855)
- Plagiometriona diffusa Buzzi, 2002
- Plagiometriona dodonea (Boheman, 1855)
- Plagiometriona dorsosignata (Boheman, 1855)
- Plagiometriona eggi (Spaeth, 1899)
- Plagiometriona enotata Spaeth, 1937
- Plagiometriona flavescens (Boheman, 1855)
- Plagiometriona foliata (Boheman, 1855)
- Plagiometriona forcipata (Boheman, 1855)
- Plagiometriona fragilicornis Spaeth, 1937
- Plagiometriona gibbifera (Champion, 1894)
- Plagiometriona glyphica (Boheman, 1855)
- Plagiometriona gyrata (Boheman, 1855)
- Plagiometriona herbea (Boheman, 1855)
- Plagiometriona inscripta (Boheman, 1855)
- Plagiometriona jucunda (Kirsch, 1876)
- Plagiometriona latemarginata Borowiec, 2001
- Plagiometriona latifoliata Spaeth, 1937
- Plagiometriona liturata (Boheman, 1855)
- Plagiometriona losi Borowiec, 1998
- Plagiometriona ludicra (Boheman, 1855)
- Plagiometriona maculigera Spaeth, 1937
- Plagiometriona mellitula Spaeth, 1937
- Plagiometriona microcera (Boheman, 1855)
- Plagiometriona nobilis Spaeth, 1937
- Plagiometriona nympha (Boheman, 1855)
- Plagiometriona ohausi Spaeth, 1937
- Plagiometriona paleacea (Boheman, 1855)
- Plagiometriona palmeirensis Buzzi, 1991
- Plagiometriona pehlkei Spaeth, 1912
- Plagiometriona pernix Spaeth, 1912
- Plagiometriona perroudi (Boheman, 1862)
- Plagiometriona peruana Spaeth, 1912
- Plagiometriona phoebe (Boheman, 1855)
- Plagiometriona plagiata (Boheman, 1855)
- Plagiometriona praecincta (Boheman, 1855)
- Plagiometriona pulchella Spaeth, 1937
- Plagiometriona punctatissima (Boheman, 1855)
- Plagiometriona punctipennis (Boheman, 1855)
- Plagiometriona ramosa (Boheman, 1855)
- Plagiometriona resplendens (Kirsch, 1865)
- Plagiometriona rubridorsis Spaeth, 1912
- Plagiometriona sahlbergi (Boheman, 1855)
- Plagiometriona separata (Boheman, 1855)
- Plagiometriona seriata Spaeth, 1937
- Plagiometriona sponsa Spaeth, 1912
- Plagiometriona steinheili (Wagener, 1877)
- Plagiometriona stillata (Boheman, 1855)
- Plagiometriona subparallela (Spaeth, 1926)
- Plagiometriona subprasina (Spaeth, 1902)
- Plagiometriona superba Spaeth, 1937
- Plagiometriona suspecta (Boheman, 1855)
- Plagiometriona tenella (Klug, 1829)
- Plagiometriona tortuguilla Zayas, 1989
- Plagiometriona translucida Spaeth, 1937
- Plagiometriona tredecimguttata (Boheman, 1862)
- Plagiometriona vesiculifera (Boheman, 1862)
- Plagiometriona vespertilio (Spaeth, 1902)
- Plagiometriona vigens (Boheman, 1855)
- Plagiometriona voluptaria (Boheman, 1855)
- Plagiometriona zelleri (Boheman, 1855)
- Plagiometriona zikani Spaeth, 1937
