= Microctenochira reticularis =

Scientific classification
- Kingdom: Animalia
- Phylum: Arthropoda
- Clade: Pancrustacea
- Class: Insecta
- Order: Coleoptera
- Suborder: Polyphaga
- Infraorder: Cucujiformia
- Family: Chrysomelidae
- Genus: Microctenochira
- Species: M. reticularis

Binomial name
- Microctenochira reticularis (De Geer, 1775)

Synonyms
- Cassida reticularis De Geer, 1775; Cassida retiformis Haroid, 1870; Cassida hebraea Fabricius, 1781; Cassida plecta Erichson, 1847; Coptocycla retifera Boheman, 1855; Ctenochira kirschi Spaeth, 1919; Coptocycla retexta Harold, 1872; Ctenochira respersa Kirsch, 1883; Ctenochira reticulata callangana Spaeth, 1926

Species of beetle

Microctenochira reticularis is a species of beetle of the family Chrysomelidae. It is found in Bolivia, Brazil (Amazonas, Pará, Pernambuco, Rio de Janeiro), Colombia, Ecuador, French Guiana, Peru, Surinam, Trinidad and Tobago and Venezuela.
