= Agroiconota tristriata =

Scientific classification
- Kingdom: Animalia
- Phylum: Arthropoda
- Clade: Pancrustacea
- Class: Insecta
- Order: Coleoptera
- Suborder: Polyphaga
- Infraorder: Cucujiformia
- Family: Chrysomelidae
- Genus: Agroiconota
- Species: A. tristriata

Binomial name
- Agroiconota tristriata (Fabricius, 1792)

Synonyms
- Cassida tristriata Fabricius, 1792

Species of beetle

Agroiconota tristriata is a species of beetle of the family Chrysomelidae. It is found in Argentina, Brazil (Amazonas, Maranhão, Mato Grosso, Minas Gerais, Pará, Santa Catarina, São Paulo), French Guiana, Peru, Paraguay, Suriname, Trinidad and Tobago and Venezuela .
