= Parorectis callosa =

Scientific classification
- Kingdom: Animalia
- Phylum: Arthropoda
- Class: Insecta
- Order: Coleoptera
- Suborder: Polyphaga
- Infraorder: Cucujiformia
- Family: Chrysomelidae
- Genus: Parorectis
- Species: P. callosa

Binomial name
- Parorectis callosa (Boheman, 1854)

Species of beetle

Parorectis callosa is a species of tortoise beetle in the family Chrysomelidae. It is found in North America.
