= Charidotis tantilla =

Scientific classification
- Kingdom: Animalia
- Phylum: Arthropoda
- Clade: Pancrustacea
- Class: Insecta
- Order: Coleoptera
- Suborder: Polyphaga
- Infraorder: Cucujiformia
- Family: Chrysomelidae
- Genus: Charidotis
- Species: C. tantilla

Binomial name
- Charidotis tantilla Boheman, 1855

Species of beetle

Charidotis tantilla is a species of beetle of the family Chrysomelidae. It is found in Brazil (Bahia, Mato Grosso, Rio de Janeiro, Pernambuco).
