= Floridocassis =

Scientific classification
- Kingdom: Animalia
- Phylum: Arthropoda
- Clade: Pancrustacea
- Class: Insecta
- Order: Coleoptera
- Suborder: Polyphaga
- Infraorder: Cucujiformia
- Family: Chrysomelidae
- Subfamily: Cassidinae
- Tribe: Cassidini
- Genus: Floridocassis; Spaeth in Hincks, 1952
- Species: F. repudiata

Binomial name
- Floridocassis repudiata (Suffrian, 1868)

Synonyms
- Coptocycla repudiata Suffrian, 1868

Genus of beetles

Floridocassis is a genus of tortoise beetles in the family Chrysomelidae, containing a single species, F. repudiata.
