= Charidotis =

Scientific classification
- Missing taxonomy template (fix): Charidotis

Genus of leaf beetles

Charidotis is a genus of leaf beetles of the family Chrysomelidae.

== Species ==
- Charidotis abrupta Boheman, 1855
- Charidotis admirabilis Boheman, 1855
- Charidotis aerosa Spaeth, 1936
- Charidotis affinis Spaeth, 1939
- Charidotis aguapretana Spaeth, 1939
- Charidotis amazona Sekerka, 2016
- Charidotis ambigua Boheman, 1855
- Charidotis annularis (Boheman, 1855)
- Charidotis annulifera (Boheman, 1855)
- Charidotis arrowi Spaeth, 1936
- Charidotis astraea Spaeth, 1936
- Charidotis atramentosa Boheman, 1855
- Charidotis aurofaciata Erichson, 1847XR
- Charidotis aurofasciata (Erichson, 1847)
- Charidotis auroguttata Boheman, 1855
- Charidotis aurulenta (Fabricius, 1801)
- Charidotis balteata (Champion, 1894)
- Charidotis beatula Spaeth, 1936
- Charidotis bellula Boheman, 1855
- Charidotis benedicta Boheman, 1862
- Charidotis biannulifera (Champion, 1894)
- Charidotis biarcuata (Boheman, 1855)
- Charidotis bicallosula Spaeth, 1936
- Charidotis bicincta Boheman, 1855
- Charidotis bicingulata (Boheman, 1855)
- Charidotis bimarginata Boheman, 1855
- Charidotis bipartita (Boheman, 1855)
- Charidotis bondari Spaeth, 1939
- Charidotis brevicollis Spaeth, 1936
- Charidotis candens (Boheman, 1855)
- Charidotis carbunculus Spaeth, 1926
- Charidotis cauta Spaeth, 1936
- Charidotis centromaculata Boheman, 1855
- Charidotis chacoana Spaeth, 1936
- Charidotis chermesina Spaeth, 1936
- Charidotis cinctella Boheman, 1855
- Charidotis cincticulus (Boheman, 1855)
- Charidotis circinata (Boheman, 1855)
- Charidotis circulifera Boheman, 1862
- Charidotis circulus (Boheman, 1855)
- Charidotis circumducta (Boheman, 1855)
- Charidotis circumflexa (Boheman, 1855)
- Charidotis circumscripta Boheman, 1855
- Charidotis circumtexta Boheman, 1862
- Charidotis clitelligera (Boheman, 1855)
- Charidotis clypeolata Boheman, 1855
- Charidotis coadnuta Boheman, 1862
- Charidotis coadunata Boheman, 1862
- Charidotis coccinea Boheman, 1855
- Charidotis cognata Boheman, 1855
- Charidotis concentrica (Boheman, 1855)
- Charidotis connexa (Boheman, 1855)
- Charidotis consentanea (Boheman, 1855)
- Charidotis consimilis (Boheman, 1855)
- Charidotis contexta (Boheman, 1855)
- Charidotis costaricea Spaeth, 1936
- Charidotis crenata (Boheman, 1855)
- Charidotis curtula Boheman, 1862
- Charidotis cyclops (Fabricius, 1801)
- Charidotis dahlbomi Boheman, 1855
- Charidotis descrobata Spaeth, 1936
- Charidotis desulta Spaeth, 1936
- Charidotis diabolica Swietojanska & Borowiec, 2000
- Charidotis discicollis Boheman, 1855
- Charidotis divisa Weise, 1904
- Charidotis drakei Weise, 1904
- Charidotis emendabilis Spaeth, 1936
- Charidotis erythraea Boheman, 1862
- Charidotis erythrostigma Champion, 1894
- Charidotis exigua Boheman, 1855
- Charidotis exilis Spaeth, 1936
- Charidotis exquisita (Boheman, 1862)
- Charidotis fenestralis Boheman, 1855
- Charidotis fervida Spaeth, 1936
- Charidotis flavicans Boheman, 1855
- Charidotis flavomarginata Champion, 1894
- Charidotis formalis Spaeth, 1936
- Charidotis formosa Boheman, 1855
- Charidotis frontalis Champion, 1894
- Charidotis frugalis Spaeth, 1936
- Charidotis fugitiva Spaeth, 1936
- Charidotis furunculus (Boheman, 1855)
- Charidotis furva Boheman, 1855
- Charidotis gemellata Boheman, 1855
- Charidotis gibbipennis Spaeth, 1910
- Charidotis glomerosa Boheman, 1855
- Charidotis huallagensis Spaeth, 1936
- Charidotis incincta (Boheman, 1862)
- Charidotis iris (Perty, 1830)
- Charidotis kudrnai Sekerka, 2009
- Charidotis laetabunda Spaeth, 1936
- Charidotis laevisculpta Spaeth, 1936
- Charidotis languida Spaeth, 1936
- Charidotis leprieuri (Boheman, 1855)
- Charidotis luederwaldti Spaeth, 1936
- Charidotis luteola Boheman, 1855
- Charidotis mansueta (Boheman, 1855)
- Charidotis marginalis Boheman, 1855
- Charidotis marginella (Fabricius, 1775)
- Charidotis miniata Boheman, 1855
- Charidotis miniatula Boheman, 1862
- Charidotis mnizecki Boheman, 1862
- Charidotis mrazi Spaeth, 1936
- Charidotis neglecta (Boheman, 1855)
- Charidotis nevermanni Spaeth, 1936
- Charidotis nigrocincta Boheman, 1855
- Charidotis nucleata Boheman, 1855
- Charidotis oblectans Spaeth, 1936
- Charidotis obtrita Spaeth, 1936
- Charidotis obtusa (Boheman, 1855)
- Charidotis ocularis Boheman, 1855
- Charidotis oculata (Boheman, 1855)
- Charidotis orbifera Boheman, 1855
- Charidotis paganettii Spaeth, 1936
- Charidotis pastica Spaeth, 1936
- Charidotis perplacens Spaeth, 1936
- Charidotis petulans Spaeth, 1936
- Charidotis phaedra Spaeth, 1936
- Charidotis plicatula Boheman, 1855
- Charidotis porosula Spaeth, 1902
- Charidotis princeps Spaeth, 1936
- Charidotis procincta (Boheman, 1855)
- Charidotis pulchra Spaeth, 1902
- Charidotis pumilio Spaeth, 1936
- Charidotis punctatostriata Boheman, 1856
- Charidotis pupillata (Boheman, 1855)
- Charidotis pustulata Champion, 1894
- Charidotis pygmaea (Klug, 1829)
- Charidotis quadrimaculata Kirsch, 1876
- Charidotis quadrioculata (Boheman, 1855)
- Charidotis reinecki Spaeth, 1936
- Charidotis repanda (Boheman, 1855)
- Charidotis rochai Simoes & Sekerka, 2024XR
- Charidotis romani Weise, 1921
- Charidotis rotundata Boheman, 1855
- Charidotis rubrocincta Boheman, 1855
- Charidotis rubrodiscoidalis (Boheman, 1855)
- Charidotis rubropicta (Boheman, 1855)
- Charidotis rubrovittata (Boheman, 1855)
- Charidotis scarlatina Spaeth, 1936
- Charidotis seminulum Boheman, 1855
- Charidotis signoreti (Boheman, 1855)
- Charidotis soror Boheman, 1855
- Charidotis speculum (Boheman, 1855)
- Charidotis sphaerica Spaeth, 1936
- Charidotis spreta Boheman, 1855
- Charidotis strandi Spaeth, 1936
- Charidotis subrubra Spaeth, 1936
- Charidotis subrugosa (Boheman, 1855)
- Charidotis supposita (Linnaeus, 1767)
- Charidotis surda (Boheman, 1855)
- Charidotis tantilla Boheman, 1855
- Charidotis terenosensis Buzzi, 2002
- Charidotis tersa Spaeth, 1936
- Charidotis tessellata Boheman, 1855
- Charidotis tricolor Boheman, 1855
- Charidotis tuberculata Swietojanska & Borowiec, 2000
- Charidotis turbida Spaeth, 1936
- Charidotis turialbana Spaeth, 1936
- Charidotis valentula Spaeth, 1936
- Charidotis venusta Spaeth, 1936
- Charidotis virgata (Boheman, 1855)
- Charidotis vitreata (Perty, 1830)
- Charidotis vittata (Wagener, 1877)
- Charidotis yucatanensis Champion, 1894
- Charidotis zikani Spaeth, 1936
