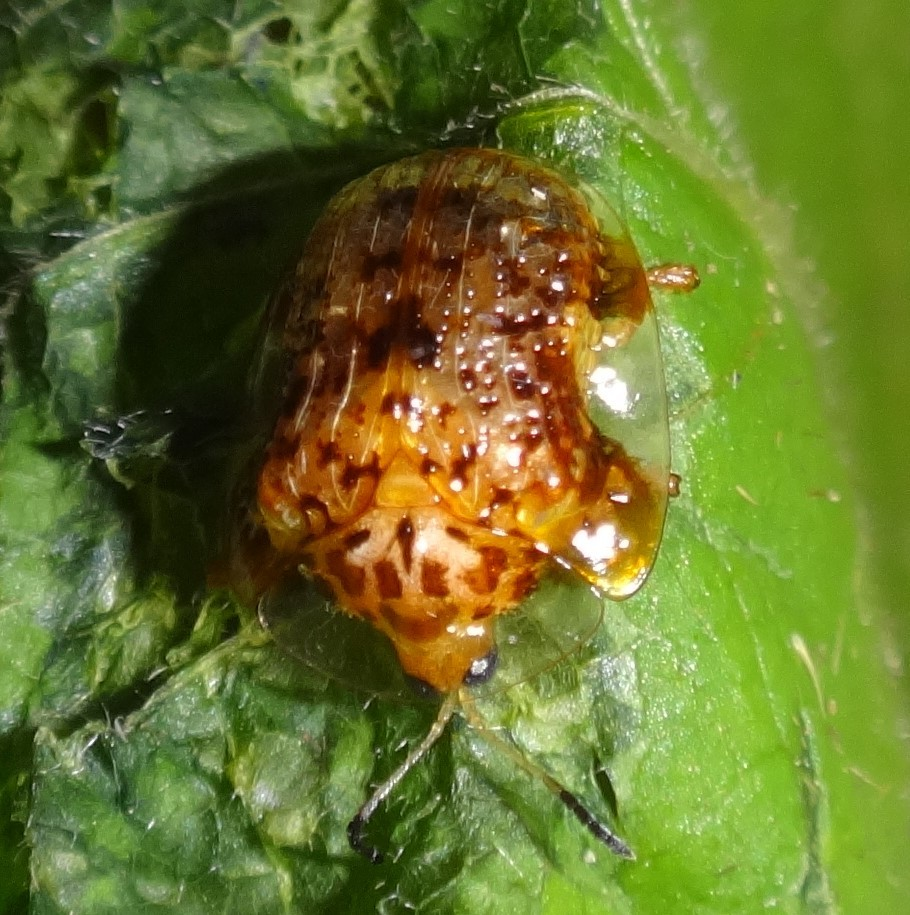
- Microctenochira hectica

Scientific classification
- Kingdom: Animalia
- Phylum: Arthropoda
- Clade: Pancrustacea
- Class: Insecta
- Order: Coleoptera
- Suborder: Polyphaga
- Infraorder: Cucujiformia
- Family: Chrysomelidae
- Tribe: Cassidini
- Genus: Microctenochira; Spaeth, 1926

Diversity
- at least 110 species

Synonyms
- Euctenochira Hincks, 1950

= Microctenochira =

Genus of beetles

Microctenochira is a genus of tortoise beetles in the family Chrysomelidae. There are at least 110 described species in the genus Microctenochira.

== See also ==
- List of Microctenochira species
