= Oediopalpa teutonica =

Scientific classification
- Kingdom: Animalia
- Phylum: Arthropoda
- Class: Insecta
- Order: Coleoptera
- Suborder: Polyphaga
- Infraorder: Cucujiformia
- Family: Chrysomelidae
- Genus: Oediopalpa
- Species: O. teutonica

Binomial name
- Oediopalpa teutonica (Uhmann, 1948)

Synonyms
- Amplipalpa teutonica Uhmann, 1948

Species of beetle

Oediopalpa teutonica is a species of beetle of the family Chrysomelidae. It is found in Brazil (Santa Catharina).

== Description ==
Adults reach a length of about 5.8 mm. Adults are similar to Oediopalpa indiscreta, but in teutonica the antennae are not metallic blue, the legs are not uniformly yellowish-brown and the underside is entirely reddish-brown.
