= Spilophora pulchra =

Scientific classification
- Kingdom: Animalia
- Phylum: Arthropoda
- Class: Insecta
- Order: Coleoptera
- Suborder: Polyphaga
- Infraorder: Cucujiformia
- Family: Chrysomelidae
- Genus: Spilophora
- Species: S. pulchra

Binomial name
- Spilophora pulchra Boheman, 1850

Species of beetle

Spilophora pulchra is a species of beetle of the family Chrysomelidae. It is found in Brazil (Amazonas), Colombia and Ecuador.

== Life history ==
No host plant has been documented for this species.
