= Oediopalpa collaris =

Scientific classification
- Kingdom: Animalia
- Phylum: Arthropoda
- Clade: Pancrustacea
- Class: Insecta
- Order: Coleoptera
- Suborder: Polyphaga
- Infraorder: Cucujiformia
- Family: Chrysomelidae
- Genus: Oediopalpa
- Species: O. collaris

Binomial name
- Oediopalpa collaris (Guérin-Méneville, 1844)

Synonyms
- Cephaloleia collaris Guérin-Méneville, 1844

Species of beetle

Oediopalpa collaris is a species of beetle of the family Chrysomelidae. It is found in Argentina, Bolivia, Brazil (Bahia, Goiás, Minas Gerais, Pernambuco) and Suriname.

== Description ==
Adults are elongate, parallel, moderately convex and shining. The head and antennae are black and the thorax is bright red with an angular brassy- or blue-black spot on the apical margin.

== Life history ==
The recorded host plants for this species are Poaceae species.
