= Spilophora bohemani =

Scientific classification
- Kingdom: Animalia
- Phylum: Arthropoda
- Class: Insecta
- Order: Coleoptera
- Suborder: Polyphaga
- Infraorder: Cucujiformia
- Family: Chrysomelidae
- Genus: Spilophora
- Species: S. bohemani

Binomial name
- Spilophora bohemani Baly, 1859

Species of beetle

Spilophora bohemani is a species of beetle of the family Chrysomelidae. It is found in Brazil (Amazonas, São Paulo).

== Life history ==
No host plant has been documented for this species.
