= Oediopalpa fulviceps =

Scientific classification
- Kingdom: Animalia
- Phylum: Arthropoda
- Class: Insecta
- Order: Coleoptera
- Suborder: Polyphaga
- Infraorder: Cucujiformia
- Family: Chrysomelidae
- Genus: Oediopalpa
- Species: O. fulviceps

Binomial name
- Oediopalpa fulviceps (Weise, 1905)

Synonyms
- Amplipalpa fulviceps Weise, 1905

Species of beetle

Oediopalpa fulviceps is a species of beetle of the family Chrysomelidae. It is found in Bolivia.

== Description ==
Adults reach a length of about 5 mm. Adults are black, with a red head and blueish-green elytron.
