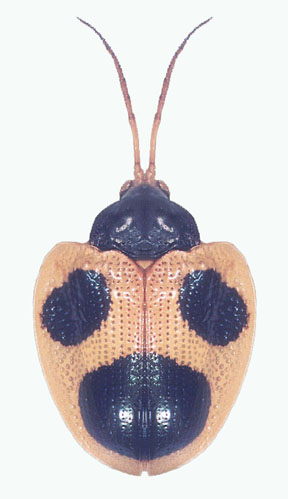

Scientific classification
- Kingdom: Animalia
- Phylum: Arthropoda
- Clade: Pancrustacea
- Class: Insecta
- Order: Coleoptera
- Suborder: Polyphaga
- Infraorder: Cucujiformia
- Family: Chrysomelidae
- Genus: Spilophora
- Species: S. trigemina

Binomial name
- Spilophora trigemina (Guérin-Méneville, 1844)

Synonyms
- Calyptocephala trigemina Guérin-Méneville, 1844

= Spilophora trigemina =

Species of beetle

Spilophora trigemina is a species of beetle of the family Chrysomelidae. It is found in Brazil (Pará), Ecuador, French Guiana and Peru.

== Description ==
Adults have an almost completely black pronotum and yellow elytra with dark spots in the anterior and posterior half of the disc.

== Life history ==
No host plant has been documented for this species.
