= Spilophora annulata =

Scientific classification
- Kingdom: Animalia
- Phylum: Arthropoda
- Class: Insecta
- Order: Coleoptera
- Suborder: Polyphaga
- Infraorder: Cucujiformia
- Family: Chrysomelidae
- Genus: Spilophora
- Species: S. annulata

Binomial name
- Spilophora annulata Spaeth, 1905

Synonyms
- Spilophora bohemani annulata Spaeth, 1905

Species of beetle

Spilophora annulata is a species of beetle of the family Chrysomelidae. It is found in Brazil (Amazonas).

== Life history ==
No host plant has been documented for this species.
