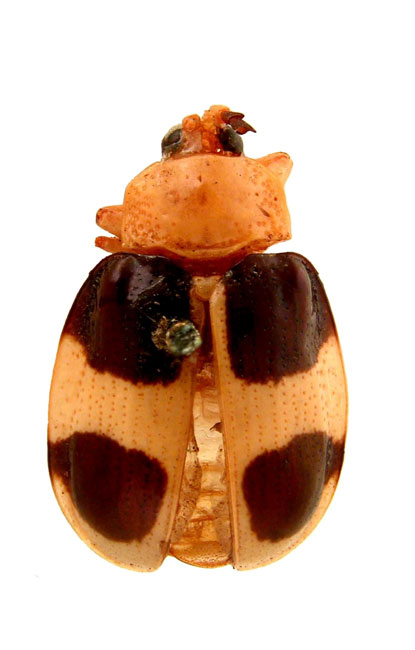

Scientific classification
- Kingdom: Animalia
- Phylum: Arthropoda
- Class: Insecta
- Order: Coleoptera
- Suborder: Polyphaga
- Infraorder: Cucujiformia
- Family: Chrysomelidae
- Genus: Cladispa
- Species: C. quadrimaculata

Binomial name
- Cladispa quadrimaculata Baly, 1858

= Cladispa quadrimaculata =

Species of beetle

Cladispa quadrimaculata is a species of beetle of the family Chrysomelidae. It is found in French Guiana and Guyana.

== Description ==
Adults reach a length of about 7.11 mm. The head, pronotum and scutellum are yellow. The elytra are also yellow, but each with two large brown spots.

== Life history ==
The recorded host plant for this species is Cyrtopodium andersonii.
