= Calyptocephala discoidea =

Scientific classification
- Kingdom: Animalia
- Phylum: Arthropoda
- Class: Insecta
- Order: Coleoptera
- Suborder: Polyphaga
- Infraorder: Cucujiformia
- Family: Chrysomelidae
- Genus: Calyptocephala
- Species: C. discoidea

Binomial name
- Calyptocephala discoidea Champion, 1893

Species of beetle

Calyptocephala discoidea is a species of beetle of the family Chrysomelidae. It is found in Costa Rica and Panama.

== Description ==
Adults reach a length of about 5-5.5 mm. Adults are subovate, rather convex and caeruleous, the elytra with the entire disc from the base to about one-third from the apex flavo-testaceous or stramineous. The scutellum is caeruleous, ferruginous or testaceous. The antennae are black or piceous, the basal one or two joints sometimes rufo-testaceous. The under surface and legs are entirely flavo-testaceous.

== Life history ==
No host plant has been documented for this species.
