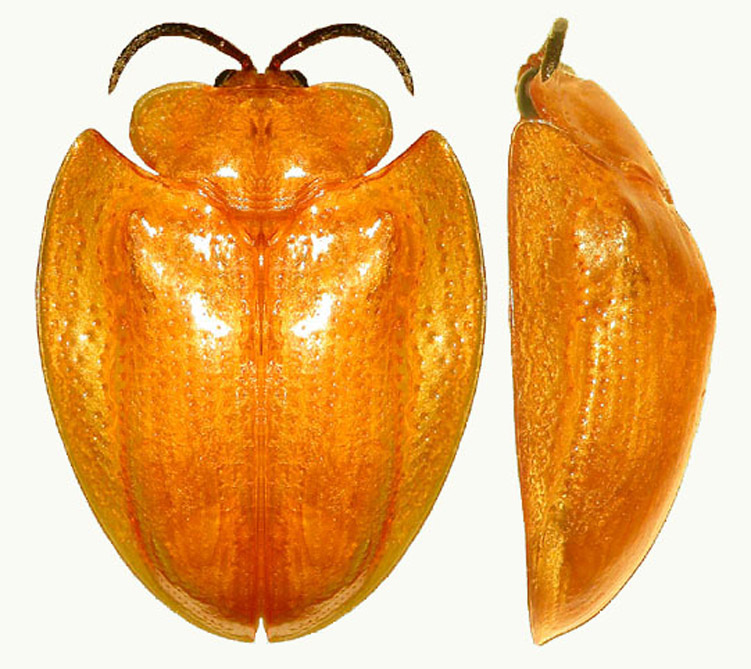

Scientific classification
- Kingdom: Animalia
- Phylum: Arthropoda
- Class: Insecta
- Order: Coleoptera
- Suborder: Polyphaga
- Infraorder: Cucujiformia
- Family: Chrysomelidae
- Genus: Calyptocephala
- Species: C. paralutea

Binomial name
- Calyptocephala paralutea Buzzi & Miyazaki, 1992

= Calyptocephala paralutea =

Species of beetle

Calyptocephala paralutea is a species of beetle of the family Chrysomelidae. It is found in Brazil (Amapá).

== Description ==
Adults reach a length of about 8.33 mm. They are yellowish-brown.

== Life history ==
The recorded host plants for this species are Elaeis guineensis and Astrocaryum species.
