= Oediopalpa jucunda =

Scientific classification
- Kingdom: Animalia
- Phylum: Arthropoda
- Class: Insecta
- Order: Coleoptera
- Suborder: Polyphaga
- Infraorder: Cucujiformia
- Family: Chrysomelidae
- Genus: Oediopalpa
- Species: O. jucunda

Binomial name
- Oediopalpa jucunda (Weise, 1910)

Synonyms
- Amplipalpa jucunda Weise, 1910

Species of beetle

Oediopalpa jucunda is a species of beetle of the family Chrysomelidae. It is found in Brazil and Colombia.

== Life history ==
No host plant has been documented for this species.
