= Oediopalpa fulva =

Scientific classification
- Kingdom: Animalia
- Phylum: Arthropoda
- Class: Insecta
- Order: Coleoptera
- Suborder: Polyphaga
- Infraorder: Cucujiformia
- Family: Chrysomelidae
- Genus: Oediopalpa
- Species: O. fulva

Binomial name
- Oediopalpa fulva (Weise, 1910)

Synonyms
- Amplipalpa fulva Weise, 1910

Species of beetle

Oediopalpa fulva is a species of beetle of the family Chrysomelidae. It is found in Bolivia.

== Life history ==
No host plant has been documented for this species.
