= Spilophora peruana =

Scientific classification
- Kingdom: Animalia
- Phylum: Arthropoda
- Class: Insecta
- Order: Coleoptera
- Suborder: Polyphaga
- Infraorder: Cucujiformia
- Family: Chrysomelidae
- Genus: Spilophora
- Species: S. peruana

Binomial name
- Spilophora peruana (Erichson, 1847)

Synonyms
- Calyptocephala peruana Erichson, 1847

Species of beetle

Spilophora peruana is a species of beetle of the family Chrysomelidae. It is found in Bolivia, Colombia and Peru.

== Life history ==
No host plant has been documented for this species.
