= Calyptocephala miniatipennis =

Scientific classification
- Kingdom: Animalia
- Phylum: Arthropoda
- Class: Insecta
- Order: Coleoptera
- Suborder: Polyphaga
- Infraorder: Cucujiformia
- Family: Chrysomelidae
- Genus: Calyptocephala
- Species: C. miniatipennis

Binomial name
- Calyptocephala miniatipennis Boheman, 1862

Species of beetle

Calyptocephala miniatipennis is a species of beetle of the family Chrysomelidae. It is found in French Guiana.

== Life history ==
No host plant has been documented for this species.
