= Calyptocephala nigricornis =

Scientific classification
- Kingdom: Animalia
- Phylum: Arthropoda
- Class: Insecta
- Order: Coleoptera
- Suborder: Polyphaga
- Infraorder: Cucujiformia
- Family: Chrysomelidae
- Genus: Calyptocephala
- Species: C. nigricornis

Binomial name
- Calyptocephala nigricornis (Germar, 1824)

Synonyms
- Cassida nigricornis Germar, 1824

Species of beetle

Calyptocephala nigricornis is a species of beetle of the family Chrysomelidae. It is found in Brazil (Paraná, Rio Grande do Sul, Rio de Janeiro, Santa Catarina).

== Life history ==
No host plant has been documented for this species.
