= Oediopalpa laevicollis =

Scientific classification
- Kingdom: Animalia
- Phylum: Arthropoda
- Class: Insecta
- Order: Coleoptera
- Suborder: Polyphaga
- Infraorder: Cucujiformia
- Family: Chrysomelidae
- Genus: Oediopalpa
- Species: O. laevicollis

Binomial name
- Oediopalpa laevicollis (Uhmann, 1932)

Synonyms
- Amplipalpa laevicollis Uhmann, 1932

Species of beetle

Oediopalpa laevicollis is a species of beetle of the family Chrysomelidae. It is found in Brazil.

== Life history ==
No host plant has been documented for this species.
