= Oediopalpa gibbula =

Scientific classification
- Kingdom: Animalia
- Phylum: Arthropoda
- Class: Insecta
- Order: Coleoptera
- Suborder: Polyphaga
- Infraorder: Cucujiformia
- Family: Chrysomelidae
- Genus: Oediopalpa
- Species: O. gibbula

Binomial name
- Oediopalpa gibbula (Uhmann, 1948)

Synonyms
- Amplipalpa gibbula Uhmann, 1948

Species of beetle

Oediopalpa gibbula is a species of beetle of the family Chrysomelidae. It is found in Brazil (Rio de Janeiro, Santa Catarina, São Paulo).

== Description ==
Adults reach a length of about 4.5 mm. Adults are black, while the antennae and legs are yellowish-brown.

== Life history ==
No host plant has been documented for this species.
