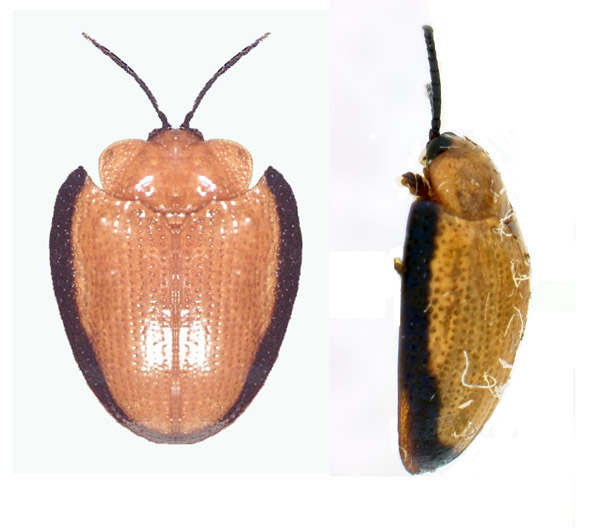
- Calyptocephala marginipennis

Scientific classification
- Kingdom: Animalia
- Phylum: Arthropoda
- Clade: Pancrustacea
- Class: Insecta
- Order: Coleoptera
- Suborder: Polyphaga
- Infraorder: Cucujiformia
- Family: Chrysomelidae
- Subfamily: Cassidinae
- Tribe: Spilophorini
- Genus: Calyptocephala; Chevrolat, 1836

= Calyptocephala =

Genus of beetles

Calyptocephala is a genus of beetle in the subfamily Cassidinae of family Chrysomelidae.

== Species ==
- Calyptocephala attenuata Spaeth, 1919
- Calyptocephala brevicornis Boheman, 1850
- Calyptocephala discoidea Champion, 1893
- Calyptocephala gerstaeckeri Boheman, 1862
- Calyptocephala lutea Boheman, 1850
- Calyptocephala marginipennis Boheman, 1850
- Calyptocephala miniatipennis Boheman, 1862
- Calyptocephala nigricornis (Germar, 1824)
- Calyptocephala paralutea Buzzi & Miyazaki, 1992
- Calyptocephala punctata Boheman, 1850
- Calyptocephala ruficornis Spaeth, 1937

== Selected former species ==
- Calyptocephala procerula (Boheman, 1862)
