= Calyptocephala attenuata =

Scientific classification
- Kingdom: Animalia
- Phylum: Arthropoda
- Clade: Pancrustacea
- Class: Insecta
- Order: Coleoptera
- Suborder: Polyphaga
- Infraorder: Cucujiformia
- Family: Chrysomelidae
- Genus: Calyptocephala
- Species: C. attenuata

Binomial name
- Calyptocephala attenuata Spaeth, 1919

Species of tortoise beetles

Calyptocephala attenuata is a species of tortoise beetle in the genus Calyptocephala.

== Description ==
Calyptocephala attenuata are egg-shaped with the greatest breadth in the middle of the elytra and the rear being more narrow then the front. The elytra are a shiny blood-red color with small dotted lines from front to back. The first two segments of the antennae are red and the other segments are black.

== Distribution ==
This species can be found in South America and Central America, where it has been recorded from Costa Rica, Nicaragua, Panama and Suriname.

== Life history ==
The recorded host plants for this species are Chamaedorea wendlandiana and Oenocarpus panamanus.
