= Oediopalpa laticollis =

Scientific classification
- Kingdom: Animalia
- Phylum: Arthropoda
- Class: Insecta
- Order: Coleoptera
- Suborder: Polyphaga
- Infraorder: Cucujiformia
- Family: Chrysomelidae
- Genus: Oediopalpa
- Species: O. laticollis

Binomial name
- Oediopalpa laticollis Baly, 1858

Species of beetle

Oediopalpa laticollis is a species of beetle of the family Chrysomelidae. It is found in Bolivia, Ecuador and Peru.

== Description ==
Adults are oblong, moderately convex above and shining black with a bluish tinge. The thorax is testaceous and the elytra are shining blue.

== Life history ==
No host plant has been documented for this species.
