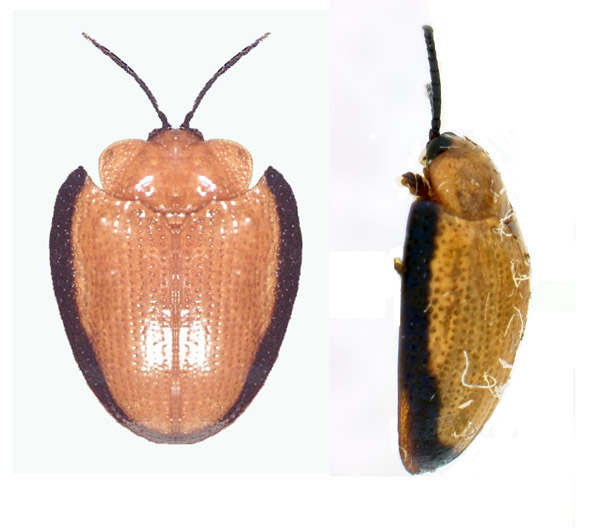

Scientific classification
- Kingdom: Animalia
- Phylum: Arthropoda
- Class: Insecta
- Order: Coleoptera
- Suborder: Polyphaga
- Infraorder: Cucujiformia
- Family: Chrysomelidae
- Genus: Calyptocephala
- Species: C. marginipennis

Binomial name
- Calyptocephala marginipennis Boheman, 1850

= Calyptocephala marginipennis =

Species of tortoise beetles

Calyptocephala marginipennis is a species of tortoise beetles in the genus Calyptocephala.

== Distribution ==
This species can be found in Tropical and subtropical moist broadleaf forests in Mexico, but is also found in French Guiana, Guatemala, Nicaragua and Venezuela.

== Life history ==
The recorded host plants for this species are Chamaedorea tepejilote, Bactris gasipaes and Elaeis guineensis.
