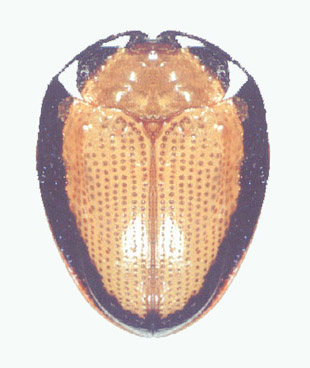

Scientific classification
- Kingdom: Animalia
- Phylum: Arthropoda
- Class: Insecta
- Order: Coleoptera
- Suborder: Polyphaga
- Infraorder: Cucujiformia
- Family: Chrysomelidae
- Genus: Calyptocephala
- Species: C. gerstaeckeri

Binomial name
- Calyptocephala gerstaeckeri Boheman, 1862

= Calyptocephala gerstaeckeri =

Species of tortoise beetles

Calyptocephala gerstaeckeri is a species of tortoise beetles in the genus Calyptocephala. It is found in Belize, Costa Rica, Guatemala, Mexico (Chiapas, Tabasco), Nicaragua and Panama.

== Life history ==
The recorded host plants for this species are Elaeis guineensis, Chamaedorea elegans and Chamaedorea tepejilote.
