= Spilophora cuneata =

Scientific classification
- Kingdom: Animalia
- Phylum: Arthropoda
- Class: Insecta
- Order: Coleoptera
- Suborder: Polyphaga
- Infraorder: Cucujiformia
- Family: Chrysomelidae
- Genus: Spilophora
- Species: S. cuneata

Binomial name
- Spilophora cuneata Borowiec, 2004

Species of beetle

Spilophora cuneata is a species of beetle of the family Chrysomelidae. It is found in Ecuador.

== Description ==
Adults reach a length of about 6.6–6.9 mm. They have a yellow head yellow, while the pronotum is black. The elytra are yellow, with two large spots in the anterior half and one large spot in the posterior part. The spots are black with a faint metallic-blue tinge.

== Life history ==
No host plant has been documented for this species.
