= Oediopalpa titschacki =

Scientific classification
- Kingdom: Animalia
- Phylum: Arthropoda
- Class: Insecta
- Order: Coleoptera
- Suborder: Polyphaga
- Infraorder: Cucujiformia
- Family: Chrysomelidae
- Genus: Oediopalpa
- Species: O. titschacki

Binomial name
- Oediopalpa titschacki (Uhmann, 1953)

Synonyms
- Amplipalpa titschacki Uhmann, 1953

Species of beetle

Oediopalpa titschacki is a species of beetle of the family Chrysomelidae. It is found in Ecuador and Peru.

== Life history ==
No host plant has been documented for this species.
