= Cladispa ecuadorica =

Scientific classification
- Kingdom: Animalia
- Phylum: Arthropoda
- Class: Insecta
- Order: Coleoptera
- Suborder: Polyphaga
- Infraorder: Cucujiformia
- Family: Chrysomelidae
- Genus: Cladispa
- Species: C. ecuadorica

Binomial name
- Cladispa ecuadorica Sekerka & Windsor, 2014

Species of beetle

Cladispa ecuadorica is a species of beetle of the family Chrysomelidae. It is found in Ecuador.

== Description ==
Adults reach a length of about 6.95-7.62 mm. The head, pronotum and scutellum are yellow. The elytra are also yellow, but with a basal and apical metallic blue band.

== Life history ==
No host plant has been documented for this species, but it is thought to feed on orchids.

== Etymology ==
The species is named after Ecuador.
