= Spilophora lacrimata =

Scientific classification
- Kingdom: Animalia
- Phylum: Arthropoda
- Class: Insecta
- Order: Coleoptera
- Suborder: Polyphaga
- Infraorder: Cucujiformia
- Family: Chrysomelidae
- Genus: Spilophora
- Species: S. lacrimata

Binomial name
- Spilophora lacrimata Borowiec, 2004

Species of beetle

Spilophora lacrimata is a species of beetle of the family Chrysomelidae. It is found in Ecuador and Peru.

== Description ==
Adults reach a length of about 7.2–7.3 mm. The pronotum is black, while the elytra are yellow, with two large spots in the anterior half and one large spot in the posterior part. The spots are black with a metallic violet tinge.

== Life history ==
No host plant has been documented for this species.
