= Oediopalpa atripes =

Scientific classification
- Kingdom: Animalia
- Phylum: Arthropoda
- Class: Insecta
- Order: Coleoptera
- Suborder: Polyphaga
- Infraorder: Cucujiformia
- Family: Chrysomelidae
- Genus: Oediopalpa
- Species: O. atripes

Binomial name
- Oediopalpa atripes (Pic, 1926)

Synonyms
- Amplipala atripes Pic, 1926

Species of beetle

Oediopalpa atripes is a species of beetle of the family Chrysomelidae. It is found in Brazil (Goiás).

== Life history ==
No host plant has been documented for this species.
