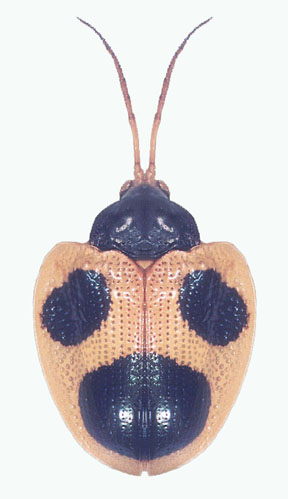
- Spilophora trigemina

Scientific classification
- Kingdom: Animalia
- Phylum: Arthropoda
- Class: Insecta
- Order: Coleoptera
- Suborder: Polyphaga
- Infraorder: Cucujiformia
- Family: Chrysomelidae
- Subfamily: Cassidinae
- Tribe: Spilophorini
- Genus: Spilophora; Boheman, 1850

= Spilophora =

Genus of leaf beetles

Spilophora is a genus of beetles belonging to the family Chrysomelidae.

== Species ==
- Spilophora aequatoriensis Spaeth, 1905
- Spilophora annulata Spaeth, 1905
- Spilophora bifasciata Spaeth, 1937
- Spilophora bohemani Baly, 1859
- Spilophora cuneata Borowiec, 2004
- Spilophora lacrimata Borowiec, 2004
- Spilophora litterifera Spaeth, 1905
- Spilophora lyra Spaeth, 1937
- Spilophora nigriceps Spaeth, 1928
- Spilophora peruana (Erichson, 1847)
- Spilophora pulchra Boheman, 1850
- Spilophora romani Weise, 1921
- Spilophora sellata Boheman, 1856
- Spilophora speciosa Baly, 1859
- Spilophora tetraspilota Baly, 1859
- Spilophora trigemina (Guérin-Méneville, 1844)
- Spilophora trimaculata (Fabricius, 1801)
- Spilophora zernyi Spaeth, 1937
