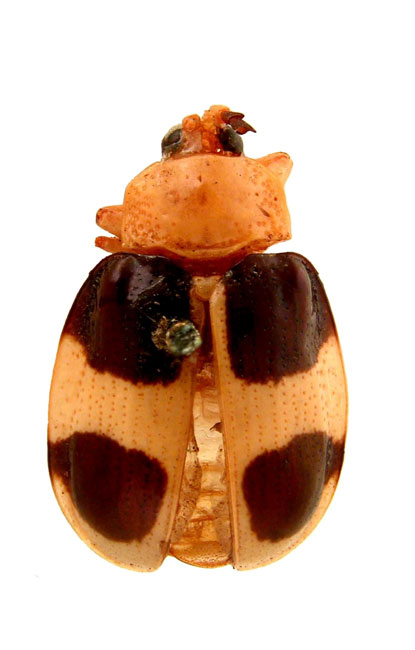
- Cladispa quadrimaculata

Scientific classification
- Kingdom: Animalia
- Phylum: Arthropoda
- Clade: Pancrustacea
- Class: Insecta
- Order: Coleoptera
- Suborder: Polyphaga
- Infraorder: Cucujiformia
- Family: Chrysomelidae
- Subfamily: Cassidinae
- Tribe: Spilophorini
- Genus: Cladispa; Baly, 1858

= Cladispa =

Genus of leaf beetles

Cladispa is a genus of beetles belonging to the family Chrysomelidae.

== Species ==
- Cladispa amboroensis Sekerka & Windsor, 2014
- Cladispa ecuadorica Sekerka & Windsor, 2014
- Cladispa quadrimaculata Baly, 1858
