= Calyptocephala punctata =

Scientific classification
- Kingdom: Animalia
- Phylum: Arthropoda
- Class: Insecta
- Order: Coleoptera
- Suborder: Polyphaga
- Infraorder: Cucujiformia
- Family: Chrysomelidae
- Genus: Calyptocephala
- Species: C. punctata

Binomial name
- Calyptocephala punctata Boheman, 1850

Species of beetle

Calyptocephala punctata is a species of beetle of the family Chrysomelidae. It is found in Bolivia, Brazil (Amazonas, Bahia, Matto Grosso, Pará), Colombia, Ecuador, French Guiana, Paraguay and Trinidad.

== Life history ==
No host plant has been documented for this species.
