= Oediopalpa cyanipennis =

Scientific classification
- Kingdom: Animalia
- Phylum: Arthropoda
- Class: Insecta
- Order: Coleoptera
- Suborder: Polyphaga
- Infraorder: Cucujiformia
- Family: Chrysomelidae
- Genus: Oediopalpa
- Species: O. cyanipennis

Binomial name
- Oediopalpa cyanipennis (Fabricius, 1801)

Synonyms
- Hispa cyanipennis Fabricius, 1801; Cephaloleia cyanoptera Guérin-Méneville, 1844

Species of beetle

Oediopalpa cyanipennis is a species of beetle of the family Chrysomelidae. It is found in Brazil and French Guiana.

== Description ==
Adults are oblong-ovate, rather broader behind, and bright shining red, with the elytra bright metallic blue and the antennae and knees black, the former slender, filiform and shorter than half the body.

== Life history ==
No host plant has been documented for this species.
