= Oediopalpa guerinii =

Scientific classification
- Kingdom: Animalia
- Phylum: Arthropoda
- Class: Insecta
- Order: Coleoptera
- Suborder: Polyphaga
- Infraorder: Cucujiformia
- Family: Chrysomelidae
- Genus: Oediopalpa
- Species: O. guerinii

Binomial name
- Oediopalpa guerinii Baly, 1858

Synonyms
- Amplipalpa guerini

Species of beetle

Oediopalpa guerinii is a species of beetle of the family Chrysomelidae. It is found in Brazil (Para), Colombia, Costa Rica, Mexico, Panama, Peru and Venezuela.

== Description ==
Adults are elongate and parallel. The head and antennae are black, the latter subfiliform. The thorax is transverse, shining testaceous above and below, with a black narrow patch on the apical margin above, the sides reflexed, straight at their base, then to the apex regularly rounded. The basal margin is deeply sinuate on either side and the medial lobe is broad and obtuse. The posterior angles are very acute, above convex, smooth and shining, distantly punctured. The scutellum is smooth and impunctate. The elytra are shining metallic blue, rather broader than the thorax, the sides parallel, narrowly margined and the apex acutely rounded.

== Life history ==
The recorded host plants for this species are Chusquea species, as well as Panicum maximum and Oryza sativa.
