= Oediopalpa graminum =

Scientific classification
- Kingdom: Animalia
- Phylum: Arthropoda
- Class: Insecta
- Order: Coleoptera
- Suborder: Polyphaga
- Infraorder: Cucujiformia
- Family: Chrysomelidae
- Genus: Oediopalpa
- Species: O. graminum

Binomial name
- Oediopalpa graminum (Uhmann, 1948)

Synonyms
- Amplipalpa graminum Uhmann, 1948

Species of beetle

Oediopalpa graminum is a species of beetle of the family Chrysomelidae. It is found in Brazil (Bahia).

== Description ==
Adults reach a length of about 5.3 mm. Adults have a greenish-cyan colour with black antennae black.

== Biology ==
They have been recorded feeding on Poaceae species.
