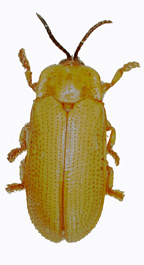
- Oediopalpa testaceipes

Scientific classification
- Kingdom: Animalia
- Phylum: Arthropoda
- Clade: Pancrustacea
- Class: Insecta
- Order: Coleoptera
- Suborder: Polyphaga
- Infraorder: Cucujiformia
- Family: Chrysomelidae
- Subfamily: Cassidinae
- Tribe: Spilophorini
- Genus: Oediopalpa; Baly, 1858

Synonyms
- Amplipalpa Harold, 1875; Charispa Baly, 1875

= Oediopalpa =

Genus of leaf beetles

Oediopalpa is a genus of beetles belonging to the family Chrysomelidae.

== Species ==
- Oediopalpa atripes (Pic, 1926)
- Oediopalpa basalis Baly, 1858
- Oediopalpa brunnea (Uhmann, 1943)
- Oediopalpa caerulea Baly, 1858
- Oediopalpa caerulescens (Baly, 1875)
- Oediopalpa collaris (Guérin-Méneville, 1844)
- Oediopalpa cyanipennis (Fabricius, 1801)
- Oediopalpa dentipes (Weise, 1910)
- Oediopalpa donckieri Pic, 1923
- Oediopalpa elongata (Baly, 1875)
- Oediopalpa foveipennis Pic, 1923
- Oediopalpa fulva (Weise, 1910)
- Oediopalpa fulviceps (Weise, 1905)
- Oediopalpa fulvipes Baly, 1858
- Oediopalpa gibbula (Uhmann, 1948)
- Oediopalpa graminum (Uhmann, 1948)
- Oediopalpa guerinii Baly, 1858
- Oediopalpa indiscreta (Uhmann, 1937)
- Oediopalpa insecta (Uhmann, 1948)
- Oediopalpa intermedia (Weise, 1910)
- Oediopalpa jucunda (Weise, 1910)
- Oediopalpa laevicollis (Uhmann, 1932)
- Oediopalpa laticollis Baly, 1858
- Oediopalpa marginata (Weise, 1910)
- Oediopalpa negligens (Weise, 1906)
- Oediopalpa nigripes Baly, 1858
- Oediopalpa pertyi (Guérin-Méneville, 1844)
- Oediopalpa plaumanni (Uhmann, 1940)
- Oediopalpa sternalis (Weise, 1910)
- Oediopalpa subconstricta Pic, 1923
- Oediopalpa testaceipes (Pic, 1926)
- Oediopalpa teutonica (Uhmann, 1948)
- Oediopalpa thoracica (Uhmann, 1930)
- Oediopalpa titschacki (Uhmann, 1953)
- Oediopalpa varipes (Weise, 1910)
- Oediopalpa variolata Uhmann, 1960
- Oediopalpa viridipennis (Pic, 1937)
