= Oediopalpa thoracica =

Scientific classification
- Kingdom: Animalia
- Phylum: Arthropoda
- Class: Insecta
- Order: Coleoptera
- Suborder: Polyphaga
- Infraorder: Cucujiformia
- Family: Chrysomelidae
- Genus: Oediopalpa
- Species: O. thoracica

Binomial name
- Oediopalpa thoracica (Uhmann, 1930)

Synonyms
- Amplipalpa thoracica Uhmann, 1930

Species of beetle

Oediopalpa thoracica is a species of beetle of the family Chrysomelidae. It is found in Brazil (Santa Catarina, São Paulo) and French Guiana.

== Life history ==
No host plant has been documented for this species.
