= Oediopalpa marginata =

Scientific classification
- Kingdom: Animalia
- Phylum: Arthropoda
- Class: Insecta
- Order: Coleoptera
- Suborder: Polyphaga
- Infraorder: Cucujiformia
- Family: Chrysomelidae
- Genus: Oediopalpa
- Species: O. marginata

Binomial name
- Oediopalpa marginata (Weise, 1910)

Synonyms
- Amplipalpa marginata Weise, 1910

Species of beetle

Oediopalpa marginata is a species of beetle of the family Chrysomelidae. It is found in Bolivia and Costa Rica.

== Life history ==
The recorded host plants for this species are Arecaceae species.
