= Oediopalpa negligens =

Scientific classification
- Kingdom: Animalia
- Phylum: Arthropoda
- Class: Insecta
- Order: Coleoptera
- Suborder: Polyphaga
- Infraorder: Cucujiformia
- Family: Chrysomelidae
- Genus: Oediopalpa
- Species: O. negligens

Binomial name
- Oediopalpa negligens (Weise, 1906)

Synonyms
- Amplipalpa negligens Weise, 1906

Species of beetle

Oediopalpa negligens is a species of beetle of the family Chrysomelidae. It is found in Argentina and Brazil.

== Life history ==
The recorded host plants for this species are Panicum gramosum and Arundo donax.
