= Calyptocephala lutea =

Scientific classification
- Kingdom: Animalia
- Phylum: Arthropoda
- Clade: Pancrustacea
- Class: Insecta
- Order: Coleoptera
- Suborder: Polyphaga
- Infraorder: Cucujiformia
- Family: Chrysomelidae
- Genus: Calyptocephala
- Species: C. lutea

Binomial name
- Calyptocephala lutea Boheman, 1850

Species of beetle

Calyptocephala lutea is a species of beetle of the family Chrysomelidae. It is found in Brazil (Pernambuco), French Guiana, Paraguay and Suriname.

== Life history ==
No host plant has been documented for this species.
