= Oediopalpa caerulescens =

Scientific classification
- Kingdom: Animalia
- Phylum: Arthropoda
- Class: Insecta
- Order: Coleoptera
- Suborder: Polyphaga
- Infraorder: Cucujiformia
- Family: Chrysomelidae
- Genus: Oediopalpa
- Species: O. caerulescens

Binomial name
- Oediopalpa caerulescens (Baly, 1875)

Synonyms
- Charispa caerulescens Baly, 1875

Species of beetle

Oediopalpa caerulescens is a species of beetle of the family Chrysomelidae. It is found in Brazil (Bahia, Minas Gerais, São Paulo) and Paraguay.

== Life history ==
No host plant has been documented for this species.
