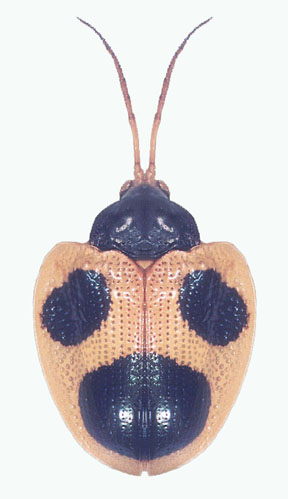
- Spilophora trigemina

Scientific classification
- Kingdom: Animalia
- Phylum: Arthropoda
- Class: Insecta
- Order: Coleoptera
- Suborder: Polyphaga
- Infraorder: Cucujiformia
- Family: Chrysomelidae
- Subfamily: Cassidinae
- Tribe: Spilophorini; Chapuis, 1875

Synonyms
- Amplipalpini Weise, 1910; Oediopalpini Monrós and Viana, 1947

= Spilophorini =

Tribe of tortoise and leaf-mining beetles

The Neotropical tortoise beetle tribe Spilophorini comprises only few genera, including Calyptocephala Chevrolat, 1836 (12 species) and Spilophora Boheman, 1850 (18 species). Biological information is limited but the life cycle includes six larval instars (contrasting with five instars in other tortoisebeetles) and the larvae construct a shield of their cast skins (exuviae, exoskeleton).

== Genera ==
- Calyptocephala Chevrolat, 1836
- Cladispa Baly, 1858
- Oediopalpa Baly, 1858
- Spilophora Boheman, 1850
