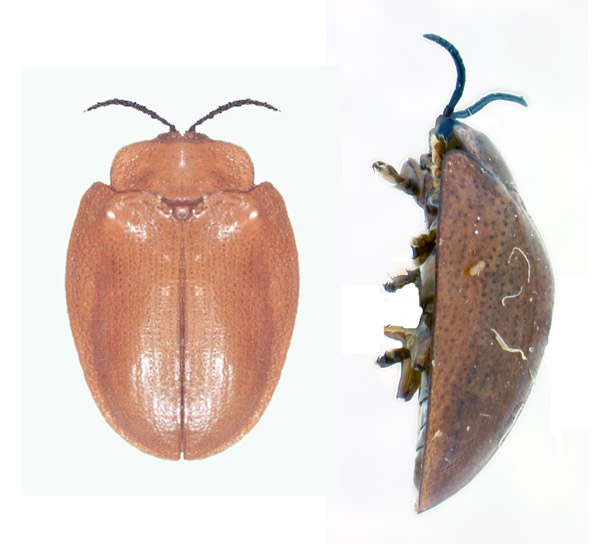

Scientific classification
- Kingdom: Animalia
- Phylum: Arthropoda
- Class: Insecta
- Order: Coleoptera
- Suborder: Polyphaga
- Infraorder: Cucujiformia
- Family: Chrysomelidae
- Genus: Calyptocephala
- Species: C. brevicornis

Binomial name
- Calyptocephala brevicornis Boheman, 1850

= Calyptocephala brevicornis =

Species of beetle

Calyptocephala brevicornis is a species of beetle of the family Chrysomelidae. It is found in Argentina (Misiones), Brazil (Amapa, Amazonas, Goiás, Matto Grosso, Minas Gerais, Parana, Rio Grande do Sul, São Paulo), Colombia, Guatemala, Mexico (Veracruz), Nicaragua, Panama, Paraguay and Venezuela.

== Life history ==
The recorded host plants for this species are Arecastrum romanzoffiana, Elaeis guineensis, Chamaedorea tepejilote, Chamaedorea wendlandiana, Dioscorea and Chusquea species.
