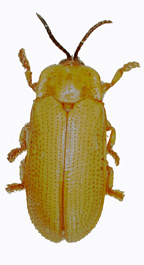

Scientific classification
- Kingdom: Animalia
- Phylum: Arthropoda
- Class: Insecta
- Order: Coleoptera
- Suborder: Polyphaga
- Infraorder: Cucujiformia
- Family: Chrysomelidae
- Genus: Oediopalpa
- Species: O. testaceipes

Binomial name
- Oediopalpa testaceipes (Pic, 1926)

Synonyms
- Amplipalpa testaceipes Pic, 1926

= Oediopalpa testaceipes =

Species of beetle

Oediopalpa testaceipes is a species of beetle of the family Chrysomelidae. It is found in Argentina (Misiones) and Brazil (Rio Grande do Sul).

== Life history ==
The recorded host plants for this species are Bambusa species.
