= Oediopalpa fulvipes =

Scientific classification
- Kingdom: Animalia
- Phylum: Arthropoda
- Class: Insecta
- Order: Coleoptera
- Suborder: Polyphaga
- Infraorder: Cucujiformia
- Family: Chrysomelidae
- Genus: Oediopalpa
- Species: O. fulvipes

Binomial name
- Oediopalpa fulvipes Baly, 1859

Species of beetle

Oediopalpa fulvipes is a species of beetle of the family Chrysomelidae. It is found in Brazil (São Paulo).

== Description ==
Adults are oblong and bright metallic green above. The head is smooth and impunctate and the antennae are fulvous. The elytra are deeply punctate-striate, with the puncturing coarser on the sides.

== Life history ==
No host plant has been documented for this species.
