= Oediopalpa pertyi =

Scientific classification
- Kingdom: Animalia
- Phylum: Arthropoda
- Clade: Pancrustacea
- Class: Insecta
- Order: Coleoptera
- Suborder: Polyphaga
- Infraorder: Cucujiformia
- Family: Chrysomelidae
- Genus: Oediopalpa
- Species: O. pertyi

Binomial name
- Oediopalpa pertyi (Guérin-Méneville, 1844)

Synonyms
- Cephaloleia pertyi Guérin-Méneville, 1844; Charispa amicula Baly, 1875; Alurnus cyanipennis Perty, 1832; (not Fabricius): Amplipalpa pertyi nigritula Weise, 1905

Species of beetle

Oediopalpa pertyi is a species of beetle of the family Chrysomelidae. It is found in Argentina, Brazil (Ceará, Mato Grosso, Pará, Rio Grande do Sul, São Paulo, Pernambuco), Colombia, Paraguay and Venezuela.

== Life history ==
The recorded host plant for this species is Pennisetum purpureum.
