= Cladispa amboroensis =

Scientific classification
- Kingdom: Animalia
- Phylum: Arthropoda
- Class: Insecta
- Order: Coleoptera
- Suborder: Polyphaga
- Infraorder: Cucujiformia
- Family: Chrysomelidae
- Genus: Cladispa
- Species: C. amboroensis

Binomial name
- Cladispa amboroensis Sekerka & Windsor, 2014

Species of beetle

Cladispa amboroensis is a species of beetle of the family Chrysomelidae. It is found in Bolivia.

== Description ==
Adults reach a length of about 7.05–7.48 mm. The head, pronotum and scutellum are yellow, the latter often with a metallic blue margin. The elytra are yellow, with metallic blue basal and apical bands.

== Life history ==
The recorded host plants for this species are Xylobium species.

== Etymology ==
The species is named after its type locality, Amboró National Park in the Santa Cruz Department of Bolivia.
