= Oediopalpa basalis =

Scientific classification
- Kingdom: Animalia
- Phylum: Arthropoda
- Class: Insecta
- Order: Coleoptera
- Suborder: Polyphaga
- Infraorder: Cucujiformia
- Family: Chrysomelidae
- Genus: Oediopalpa
- Species: O. basalis

Binomial name
- Oediopalpa basalis Baly, 1858

Synonyms
- Amplipala lata Duvivier, 1890

Species of beetle

Oediopalpa basalis is a species of beetle of the family Chrysomelidae. It is found in Brazil (Rio de Janeiro, Rio Grande do Sul, São Paulo).

== Description ==
Adults are oblong-ovate and subconvex, with the head black, the vertex pale yellow and the thorax yellow. The elytra are purple-blue with a yellow basal fascia.

== Life history ==
No host plant has been documented for this species.
