= Oediopalpa sternalis =

Scientific classification
- Kingdom: Animalia
- Phylum: Arthropoda
- Class: Insecta
- Order: Coleoptera
- Suborder: Polyphaga
- Infraorder: Cucujiformia
- Family: Chrysomelidae
- Genus: Oediopalpa
- Species: O. sternalis

Binomial name
- Oediopalpa sternalis (Weise, 1910)

Synonyms
- Amplipalpa sternalis Weise, 1910

Species of beetle

Oediopalpa sternalis is a species of beetle of the family Chrysomelidae. It is found in Brazil (Espírito Santo, São Paulo).

== Life history ==
No host plant has been documented for this species.
