= Spilophora trimaculata =

Scientific classification
- Kingdom: Animalia
- Phylum: Arthropoda
- Class: Insecta
- Order: Coleoptera
- Suborder: Polyphaga
- Infraorder: Cucujiformia
- Family: Chrysomelidae
- Genus: Spilophora
- Species: S. trimaculata

Binomial name
- Spilophora trimaculata (Fabricius, 1801)

Synonyms
- Imatidium trimaculata Fabricius, 1801

Species of beetle

Spilophora trimaculata is a species of beetle of the family Chrysomelidae. It is found in Suriname.

== Life history ==
No host plant has been documented for this species.
