= Oediopalpa insecta =

Scientific classification
- Kingdom: Animalia
- Phylum: Arthropoda
- Class: Insecta
- Order: Coleoptera
- Suborder: Polyphaga
- Infraorder: Cucujiformia
- Family: Chrysomelidae
- Genus: Oediopalpa
- Species: O. insecta

Binomial name
- Oediopalpa insecta (Uhmann, 1948)

Synonyms
- Amplipalpa insecta Uhmann, 1948

Species of beetle

Oediopalpa insecta is a species of beetle of the family Chrysomelidae. It is found in Brazil (Paraná, Rio Grande do Sul, Santa Catarina, São Paulo).

== Description ==
Adults reach a length of about 4.4–5 mm. Adults are greenish metallic, while the legs and antennae are dark with a faint metallic sheen.

== Life history ==
No host plant has been documented for this species.
