= Oediopalpa caerulea =

Scientific classification
- Kingdom: Animalia
- Phylum: Arthropoda
- Class: Insecta
- Order: Coleoptera
- Suborder: Polyphaga
- Infraorder: Cucujiformia
- Family: Chrysomelidae
- Genus: Oediopalpa
- Species: O. caerulea

Binomial name
- Oediopalpa caerulea Baly, 1858

Species of beetle

Oediopalpa caerulea is a species of beetle of the family Chrysomelidae. It is found in Brazil (Amazonas) and French Guiana.

== Description ==
Adults are oblong-elongate and shining metallic blue. The antennae are black. Each elytron has ten rows of distinct punctures, those on the sides more deeply impressed, the interstices smooth and minutely punctured.

== Life history ==
No host plant has been documented for this species.
