= Oediopalpa indiscreta =

Scientific classification
- Kingdom: Animalia
- Phylum: Arthropoda
- Class: Insecta
- Order: Coleoptera
- Suborder: Polyphaga
- Infraorder: Cucujiformia
- Family: Chrysomelidae
- Genus: Oediopalpa
- Species: O. indiscreta

Binomial name
- Oediopalpa indiscreta (Uhmann, 1937)

Synonyms
- Amplipalpa indiscreta Uhmann, 1937

Species of beetle

Oediopalpa indiscreta is a species of beetle of the family Chrysomelidae. It is found in Brazil (Goiás).

== Life history ==
No host plant has been documented for this species.
