= Balyana sculptipennis =

Scientific classification
- Kingdom: Animalia
- Phylum: Arthropoda
- Clade: Pancrustacea
- Class: Insecta
- Order: Coleoptera
- Suborder: Polyphaga
- Infraorder: Cucujiformia
- Family: Chrysomelidae
- Genus: Balyana
- Species: B. sculptipennis

Binomial name
- Balyana sculptipennis (Fairmaire, 1904)

Synonyms
- Coelaenomenodera sculptipennis Fairmaire, 1904

Species of beetle

Balyana sculptipennis is a species of beetle of the family Chrysomelidae. It is found in Madagascar.

== Description ==
Adults are bicoloured yellow and black. They are similar to Balyana pauliani and Balyana maritima, but the shape of the body, pronotum and elytra is very characteristic.

== Biology ==
The food plant is unknown.
