= Cyperispa hypolytri =

Scientific classification
- Kingdom: Animalia
- Phylum: Arthropoda
- Clade: Pancrustacea
- Class: Insecta
- Order: Coleoptera
- Suborder: Polyphaga
- Infraorder: Cucujiformia
- Family: Chrysomelidae
- Genus: Cyperispa
- Species: C. hypolytri

Binomial name
- Cyperispa hypolytri Gressitt, 1957

Species of beetle

Cyperispa hypolytri is a species of beetle of the family Chrysomelidae. It is found on the Solomon Islands (Guadalcanal).

== Description ==
Adults reach a length of about 6.9-7.6 mm. The elytra and basal half of the pronotum are black.

== Biology ==
The recorded food plants are Hypolytrum species.
