= Coelaenomenoderini =

- Coelaenomenodera tristicula

Scientific classification
- Kingdom: Animalia
- Phylum: Arthropoda
- Class: Insecta
- Order: Coleoptera
- Suborder: Polyphaga
- Infraorder: Cucujiformia
- Family: Chrysomelidae
- Subfamily: Cassidinae
- Tribe: Coelaenomenoderini; Weise, 1911

Genera
- see text

Synonyms
- Pharangispini Uhmann, 1940

Tribe of leaf beetles

Coelaenomenoderini is a tribe of leaf beetles within the subfamily Cassidinae.

== Genera ==
Biolib includes:

- Balyana Péringuey, 1898 - Africa
- Bulolispa Gressitt & Samuelson, 1990 - New Guinea
- Coelaenomenodera Blanchard, 1845 type genus - Africa
- Cyperispa Gressitt, 1957 - Pacific islands
- Enischnispa Gressitt, 1957 - New Guinea
- Heterrhachispa Gressitt, 1957 - monotypic: Australia
- Javeta Baly, 1858 - South-East Asia
- Pharangispa Maulik, 1929 - Pacific islands
- Rhabdotohispa Maulik, 1913 - monotypic: Seychelles
