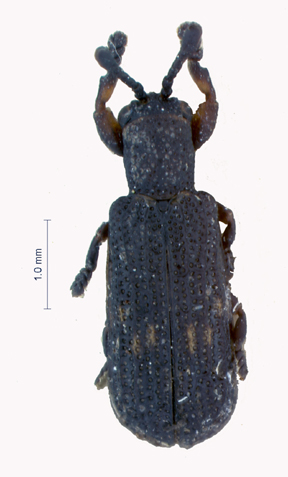

Scientific classification
- Kingdom: Animalia
- Phylum: Arthropoda
- Clade: Pancrustacea
- Class: Insecta
- Order: Coleoptera
- Suborder: Polyphaga
- Infraorder: Cucujiformia
- Family: Chrysomelidae
- Subfamily: Cassidinae
- Tribe: Coelaenomenoderini
- Genus: Rhabdotohispa; Maulik, 1913
- Species: R. scotti

Binomial name
- Rhabdotohispa scotti Maulik, 1913

= Rhabdotohispa =

Genus of beetles

Rhabdotohispa is a genus of leaf beetles in the family Chrysomelidae. It is monotypic, being represented by the single species, Rhabdotohispa scotti, which is found on the Seychelles.

== Biology ==
The recorded food plants are Roscheria, Stevensonia and Phoenicophorium species.
