= Hypolytrum subcompositus =

Conservation status
- Critically Endangered (IUCN 3.1)

Scientific classification
- Kingdom: Plantae
- Clade: Tracheophytes
- Clade: Angiosperms
- Clade: Monocots
- Clade: Commelinids
- Order: Poales
- Family: Cyperaceae
- Genus: Hypolytrum
- Species: H. subcompositus

Binomial name
- Hypolytrum subcompositus Lye & D.A.Simpson

Species of grass-like plant

Hypolytrum subcompositus is a species of plant in the family Cyperaceae. It is endemic to Cameroon. Its natural habitat is subtropical or tropical moist montane forests. It is threatened by habitat loss.
