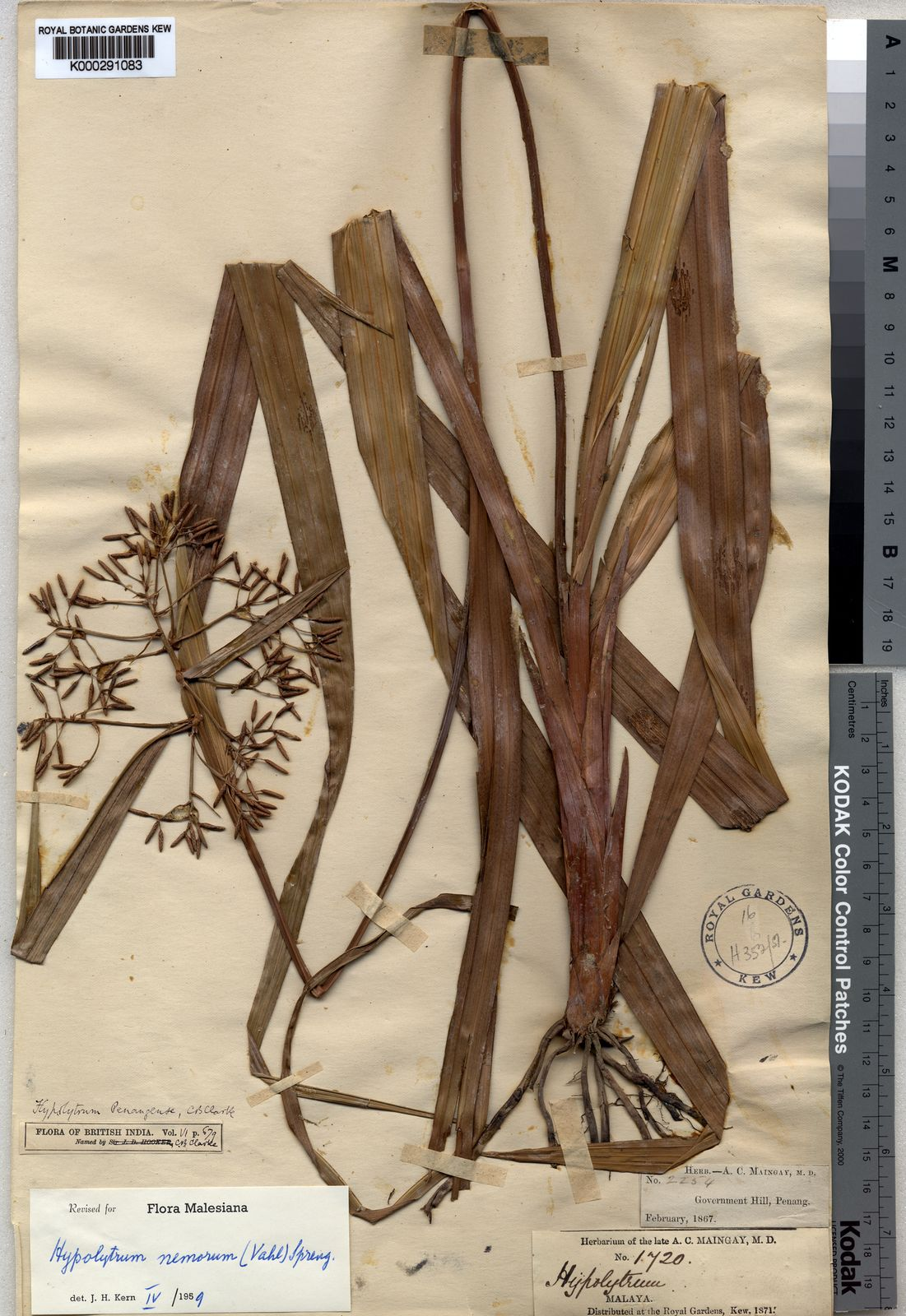
- Specimen at RGB Kew

Scientific classification
- Kingdom: Plantae
- Clade: Embryophytes
- Clade: Tracheophytes
- Clade: Spermatophytes
- Clade: Angiosperms
- Clade: Monocots
- Clade: Commelinids
- Order: Poales
- Family: Cyperaceae
- Genus: Hypolytrum
- Species: H. nemorum

Binomial name
- Hypolytrum nemorum (Vahl) Spreng., 1824

= Hypolytrum nemorum =

Species of plant

Hypolytrum nemorum is a species of plant in the family Cyperaceae. Seen in Indo-Malesia, from Fiji to China.

== Description ==
It is erect rhizomatous perennial plant growing up to 60–110 centimetres (24–43 in) with wood rhizome. Flowering throughout the year, the terminal inflorescences is corymbose-panicle.
