= Pharangispa alpiniae =

Scientific classification
- Kingdom: Animalia
- Phylum: Arthropoda
- Clade: Pancrustacea
- Class: Insecta
- Order: Coleoptera
- Suborder: Polyphaga
- Infraorder: Cucujiformia
- Family: Chrysomelidae
- Genus: Pharangispa
- Species: P. alpiniae

Binomial name
- Pharangispa alpiniae Samuelson, 1990

Species of beetle

Pharangispa alpiniae is a species of beetle of the family Chrysomelidae. It is found on the Solomon Islands (Malaita, New Georgia, Nggela, Santa Isabel).

== Description ==
Adults reach a length of about 4.4–6.8 mm. Adults are orange-testaceous, except the antennae (which are partly dark red-fuscous and partly blackish) and much of the elytron (which has a dark area with a bluish tinge in the nominate subspecies).

== Biology ==
The recorded food plants are Cocos nucifera, as well as Musa, Alpinia, Freycinetia, Pandanus and Heliconia species.

== Subspecies ==
- Pharangispa alpiniae alpiniae (Solomon Islands: Malaita)
- Pharangispa alpiniae bella Samuelson, 1990 (Solomon Islands: Santa Isabel Island)
- Pharangispa alpiniae georgiana Samuelson, 1990 (Solomon Islands: New Georgia)
- Pharangispa alpiniae marginata Samuelson, 1990 (Solomon Islands – Florida Group: Nggela Island)
