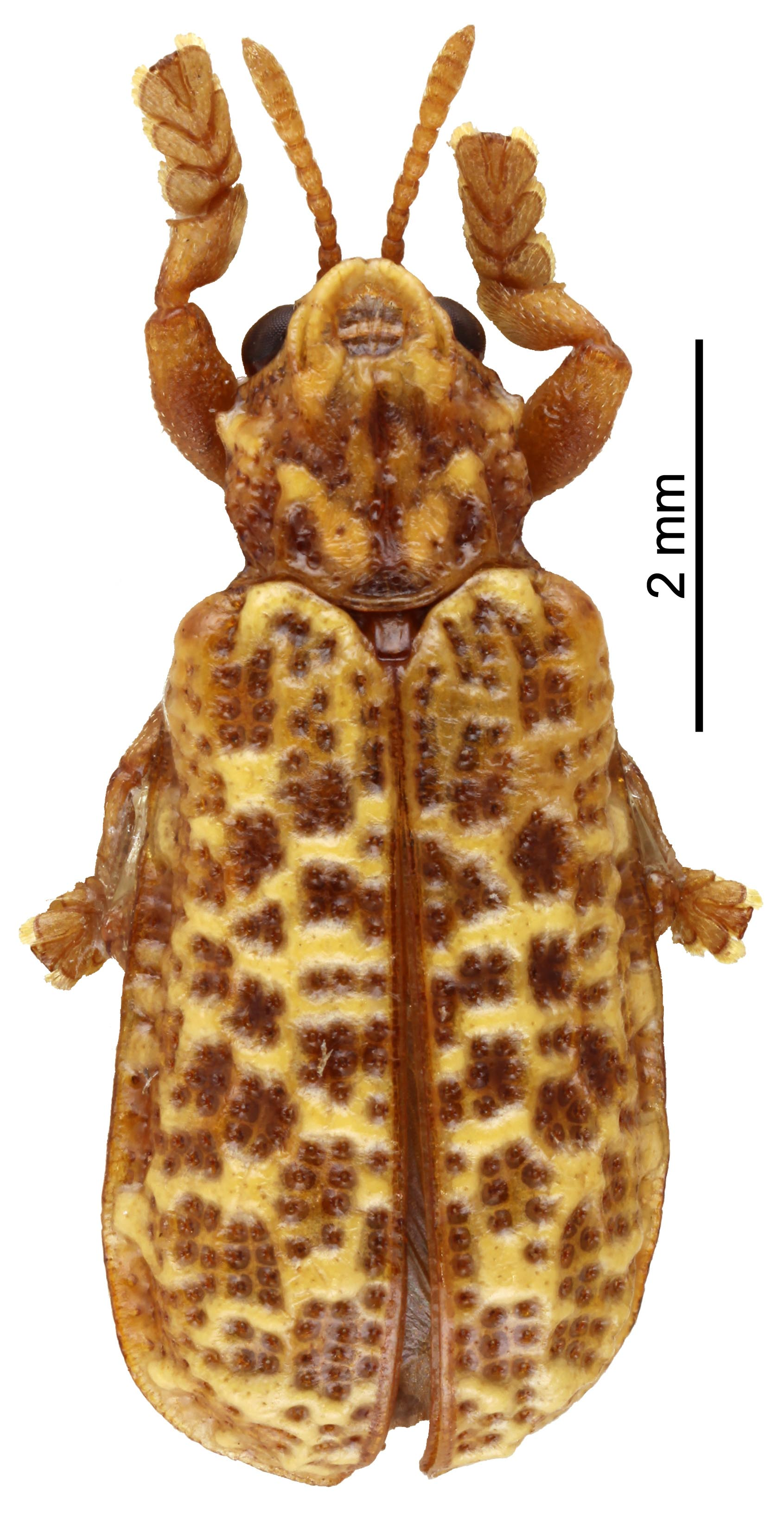

Scientific classification
- Kingdom: Animalia
- Phylum: Arthropoda
- Clade: Pancrustacea
- Class: Insecta
- Order: Coleoptera
- Suborder: Polyphaga
- Infraorder: Cucujiformia
- Family: Chrysomelidae
- Genus: Balyana
- Species: B. mariaui

Binomial name
- Balyana mariaui Berti & Desmier de Chenon, 1987

= Balyana mariaui =

Species of beetle

Balyana mariaui is a species of beetle of the family Chrysomelidae. It is found in Madagascar.

== Description ==
Adults reach a length of about 6 mm (males) and 6.2 mm (females). The upperparts are bicoloured. The markings on the pronotum and elytra are light yellow, while the background is brown. The antennae and legs are yellow, while the head is reddish with two black spots.

== Biology ==
The recorded food plants are Cocos species.
