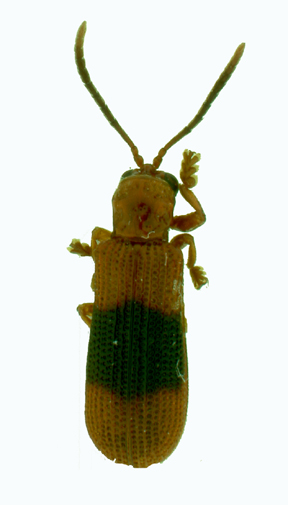
- Cyperispa palmarum

Scientific classification
- Kingdom: Animalia
- Phylum: Arthropoda
- Clade: Pancrustacea
- Class: Insecta
- Order: Coleoptera
- Suborder: Polyphaga
- Infraorder: Cucujiformia
- Family: Chrysomelidae
- Subfamily: Cassidinae
- Tribe: Coelaenomenoderini
- Genus: Cyperispa; Gressitt, 1957

= Cyperispa =

Genus of leaf beetles

Cyperispa is a genus of beetles belonging to the family Chrysomelidae.

== Species ==
- Cyperispa hypolytri Gressitt, 1957
- Cyperispa lungae Gressitt, 1990
- Cyperispa palmarum Gressitt, 1990
- Cyperispa scleriae Gressitt, 1957
- Cyperispa thoracostachyi Gressitt, 1960
