= Javeta nuda =

Scientific classification
- Kingdom: Animalia
- Phylum: Arthropoda
- Clade: Pancrustacea
- Class: Insecta
- Order: Coleoptera
- Suborder: Polyphaga
- Infraorder: Cucujiformia
- Family: Chrysomelidae
- Genus: Javeta
- Species: J. nuda

Binomial name
- Javeta nuda Uhmann, 1933

Species of beetle

Javeta nuda is a species of beetle of the family Chrysomelidae. It is found in the Philippines (Luzon).

== Biology ==
The food plant is unknown.
