= Cyperispa thoracostachyi =

Scientific classification
- Kingdom: Animalia
- Phylum: Arthropoda
- Clade: Pancrustacea
- Class: Insecta
- Order: Coleoptera
- Suborder: Polyphaga
- Infraorder: Cucujiformia
- Family: Chrysomelidae
- Genus: Cyperispa
- Species: C. thoracostachyi

Binomial name
- Cyperispa thoracostachyi Gressitt, 1960

Species of beetle

Cyperispa thoracostachyi is a species of beetle of the family Chrysomelidae. It is found on the Solomon Islands.

== Description ==
Adults reach a length of about 5.2-6 mm. Adults are pale castaneous, with the antenna pitchy in the middle, but pale on last two segments. There is broad black band on the elytra.

== Biology ==
The recorded food plants are Arecaceae, Thoracastachyum and Pandanus species.

== Subspecies ==
- Cyperispa thoracostachyi thoracostachyi (Solomon Islands: Malaita)
- Cyperispa thoracostachyi kolombangara Gressitt, 1990 (Solomon Islands: New Georgia Group - Kolombangara Island)
