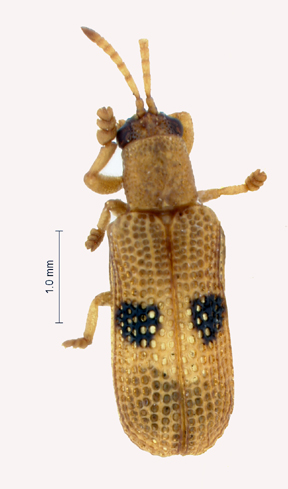

Scientific classification
- Kingdom: Animalia
- Phylum: Arthropoda
- Clade: Pancrustacea
- Class: Insecta
- Order: Coleoptera
- Suborder: Polyphaga
- Infraorder: Cucujiformia
- Family: Chrysomelidae
- Genus: Bulolispa
- Species: B. bimaculata

Binomial name
- Bulolispa bimaculata Gressitt, 1990

= Bulolispa bimaculata =

Species of beetle

Bulolispa bimaculata is a species of beetle of the family Chrysomelidae. It is found in Papua New Guinea, where it has been recorded from lower montane areas.

== Description ==
Adults reach a length of about 3.65-3.9 mm. They are pale orange-testaceous. The elytron has a rounded black spot on the central half of disc.

== Biology ==
The food plant is unknown.
