= Javeta crassicornis =

Scientific classification
- Kingdom: Animalia
- Phylum: Arthropoda
- Clade: Pancrustacea
- Class: Insecta
- Order: Coleoptera
- Suborder: Polyphaga
- Infraorder: Cucujiformia
- Family: Chrysomelidae
- Genus: Javeta
- Species: J. crassicornis

Binomial name
- Javeta crassicornis (Gestro, 1899)

Synonyms
- Gonophora (Distolaca) crassicornis Gestro, 1899

Species of beetle

Javeta crassicornis is a species of beetle of the family Chrysomelidae. It is found in Indonesia (Sumatra).

== Biology ==
The food plant is unknown.
