= Balyana =

Scientific classification
- Kingdom: Animalia
- Phylum: Arthropoda
- Clade: Pancrustacea
- Class: Insecta
- Order: Coleoptera
- Suborder: Polyphaga
- Infraorder: Cucujiformia
- Family: Chrysomelidae
- Subfamily: Cassidinae
- Tribe: Coelaenomenoderini
- Genus: Balyana; Péringuey, 1898

Synonyms
- Perrotella Berti & Desmier de Chenon, 1987

Genus of beetles

Balyana is a genus of leaf beetles in the tribe Coelaenomenoderini, found in southern Africa including Madagascar.

== Species ==
The Global Biodiversity Information Facility includes:

- Subgenus Balyana
  - Balyana armata Gestro, 1908
  - Balyana maritima Berti, 1987
  - Balyana pauliani Uhmann, 1954
  - Balyana sculptilis (Fairmaire, 1895)
  - Balyana sculptipennis (Fairmaire, 1904)
- Subgenus Perrotella Berti and Desmier de Chenon, 1987
  - Balyana mariaui Berti & Desmier de Chenon, 1987
  - Balyana oberthuri Gestro, 1908
  - Balyana ornata Gestro, 1908
