= Pharangispa cristobala =

Scientific classification
- Kingdom: Animalia
- Phylum: Arthropoda
- Clade: Pancrustacea
- Class: Insecta
- Order: Coleoptera
- Suborder: Polyphaga
- Infraorder: Cucujiformia
- Family: Chrysomelidae
- Genus: Pharangispa
- Species: P. cristobala

Binomial name
- Pharangispa cristobala Gressitt, 1957

Species of beetle

Pharangispa cristobala is a species of beetle of the family Chrysomelidae. It is found on the Solomon Islands (Makira).

== Description ==
Adults reach a length of about 4.3–5.15 mm. Adults have a dark region on the elytron, but this is confined to the inner half of the disc.

== Biology ==
The recorded food plants are Musa and Heliconia species, as well as Rattan.
