= Bulolispa =

Scientific classification
- Kingdom: Animalia
- Phylum: Arthropoda
- Clade: Pancrustacea
- Class: Insecta
- Order: Coleoptera
- Suborder: Polyphaga
- Infraorder: Cucujiformia
- Family: Chrysomelidae
- Subfamily: Cassidinae
- Tribe: Coelaenomenoderini
- Genus: Bulolispa; Gressitt & Samuelson, 1990

Genus of leaf beetles

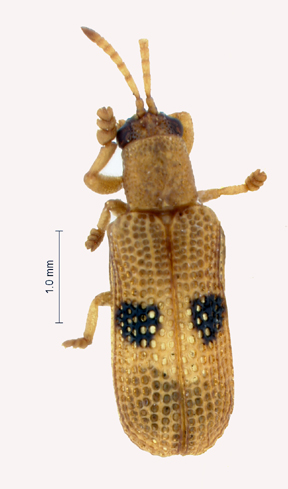
The Bulolispa bimaculata

Bulolispa is a genus of beetles belonging to the family Chrysomelidae.

== Species ==
- Bulolispa bimaculata Gressitt, 1990
- Bulolispa sublineata Samuelson, 1990
