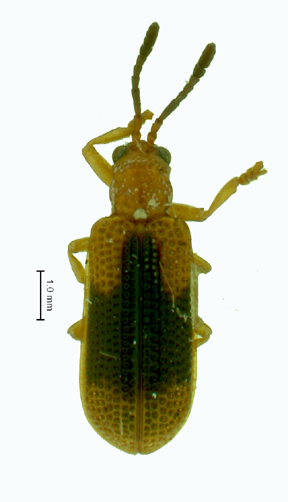

Scientific classification
- Kingdom: Animalia
- Phylum: Arthropoda
- Clade: Pancrustacea
- Class: Insecta
- Order: Coleoptera
- Suborder: Polyphaga
- Infraorder: Cucujiformia
- Family: Chrysomelidae
- Genus: Pharangispa
- Species: P. purpureipennis

Binomial name
- Pharangispa purpureipennis Maulik, 1929

= Pharangispa purpureipennis =

Species of beetle

Pharangispa purpureipennis is a species of beetle of the family Chrysomelidae. It is found on the Solomon Islands (Guadalcanal, Santa Isabel).

== Description ==
Adults reach a length of about 4.65–6.3 mm. Adults have a dark region on the elytron, covering much of disc and extending to the pale lateral margin.

== Biology ==
The recorded food plants are Zingiberaceae (including Alpinia species), Costus and Heliconia species.
