= Balyana oberthuri =

Scientific classification
- Kingdom: Animalia
- Phylum: Arthropoda
- Clade: Pancrustacea
- Class: Insecta
- Order: Coleoptera
- Suborder: Polyphaga
- Infraorder: Cucujiformia
- Family: Chrysomelidae
- Genus: Balyana
- Species: B. oberthuri

Binomial name
- Balyana oberthuri Gestro, 1908

Species of beetle

Balyana oberthuri is a species of beetle of the family Chrysomelidae. It is found in Madagascar.

== Description ==
Adults reach a length of about 7.7 mm. They are uniformly black (except for the antennae, legs, and two spots on the elytra, which are yellow).

== Biology ==
The food plant is unknown.
