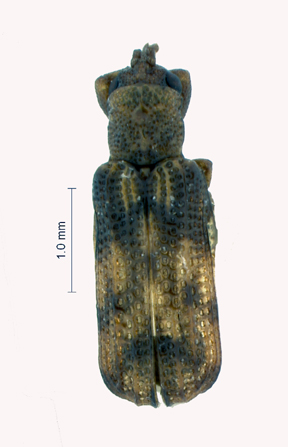

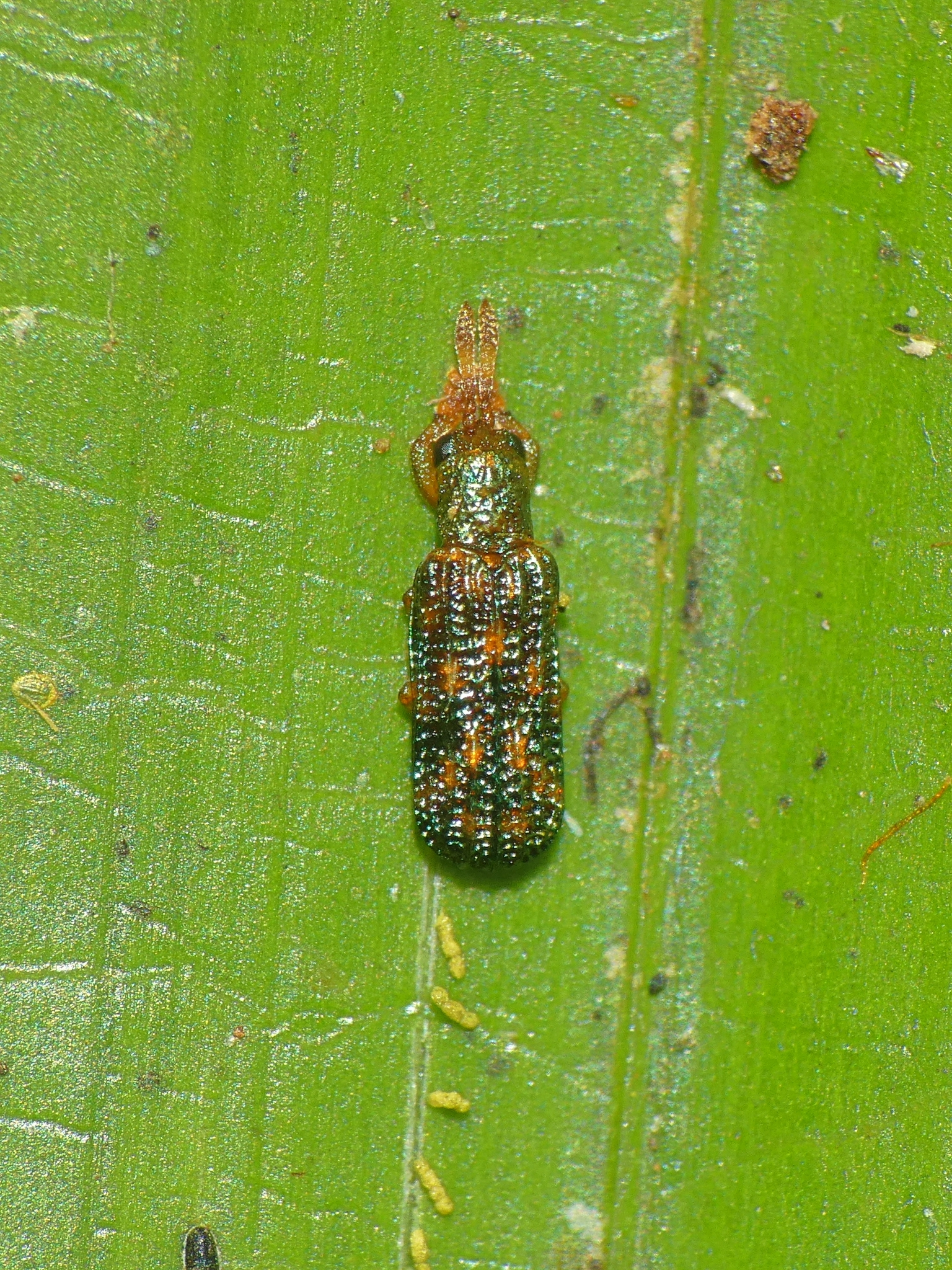

Scientific classification
- Kingdom: Animalia
- Phylum: Arthropoda
- Clade: Pancrustacea
- Class: Insecta
- Order: Coleoptera
- Suborder: Polyphaga
- Infraorder: Cucujiformia
- Family: Chrysomelidae
- Subfamily: Cassidinae
- Tribe: Coelaenomenoderini
- Genus: Heterrhachispa; Gressitt, 1957
- Species: H. kurandae

Binomial name
- Heterrhachispa kurandae Gressitt, 1957

= Heterrhachispa =

Genus of beetles

Heterrhachispa is a genus of leaf beetles in the family Chrysomelidae. It is monotypic, being represented by the single species, Heterrhachispa kurandae, which is only found in northern Queensland (Australia).

== Biology ==
The food plant is unknown.
