= Pharangispa fasciata =

Scientific classification
- Kingdom: Animalia
- Phylum: Arthropoda
- Clade: Pancrustacea
- Class: Insecta
- Order: Coleoptera
- Suborder: Polyphaga
- Infraorder: Cucujiformia
- Family: Chrysomelidae
- Genus: Pharangispa
- Species: P. fasciata

Binomial name
- Pharangispa fasciata Gressitt, 1957

Species of beetle

Pharangispa fasciata is a species of beetle of the family Chrysomelidae. It is found on the Solomon Islands (Bougainville).

== Description ==
Adults reach a length of about 5.4–6.2 mm. Adults have a dark transverse band on the elytron, which is confined mainly to the apical region.

== Biology ==
The recorded food plants are Zingiberaceae species.
