= Javeta pallida =

Scientific classification
- Kingdom: Animalia
- Phylum: Arthropoda
- Clade: Pancrustacea
- Class: Insecta
- Order: Coleoptera
- Suborder: Polyphaga
- Infraorder: Cucujiformia
- Family: Chrysomelidae
- Genus: Javeta
- Species: J. pallida

Binomial name
- Javeta pallida Baly, 1858

Synonyms
- Distolaca flavida Gestro, 1911

Species of beetle

Javeta pallida is a species of beetle of the family Chrysomelidae. It is found in India (Uttar Pradesh, West Bengal).

== Description ==
Adults are elongate, convex and pale shining fulvous. The antennae are equal in length to the head and thorax and robust. The thorax is rather longer than broad, the sides subparallel, sinuate behind, slightly narrowed in front, with the posterior angle acute and the anterior margin straight. The surface is transversely depressed behind, deeply and irregularly excavated on the sides and front, the excavated portions are coarsely punctured. The disc is irregularly shining, deeply pitted in the middle. The scutellum is smooth and shining. The elytra are broader than the thorax, the sides parallel, narrowly margined and the apex rounded, above convex, deeply and regularly punctate-striate, with the alternate interstices indistinctly costate.

== Biology ==
The food plant is unknown.
