= Cyperispa scleriae =

Scientific classification
- Kingdom: Animalia
- Phylum: Arthropoda
- Clade: Pancrustacea
- Class: Insecta
- Order: Coleoptera
- Suborder: Polyphaga
- Infraorder: Cucujiformia
- Family: Chrysomelidae
- Genus: Cyperispa
- Species: C. scleriae

Binomial name
- Cyperispa scleriae Gressitt, 1957

Species of beetle

Cyperispa scleriae is a species of beetle of the family Chrysomelidae. It is found on the Solomon Islands.

== Description ==
Adults reach a length of about 4.5-5.15 mm. Adults are testaceous, with black antennae with brown areas. There is a dark band on the elytra.

== Biology ==
The possible food plants are Scleria species.

== Subspecies ==
- Cyperispa scleriae scleriae (Solomon Islands: Guadalcanal)
- Cyperispa scleriae malaitensis Gressitt, 1960 (Solomon Islands: Malaita)
- Cyperispa scleriae gelae Gressitt, 1990 (Solomon Islands: Florida Group - Nggela Island)
