= Pharangispa heliconiae =

Scientific classification
- Kingdom: Animalia
- Phylum: Arthropoda
- Clade: Pancrustacea
- Class: Insecta
- Order: Coleoptera
- Suborder: Polyphaga
- Infraorder: Cucujiformia
- Family: Chrysomelidae
- Genus: Pharangispa
- Species: P. heliconiae

Binomial name
- Pharangispa heliconiae Gressitt, 1990

Species of beetle

Pharangispa heliconiae is a species of beetle of the family Chrysomelidae. It is found on the Solomon Islands (Santa Isabel).

== Description ==
Adults reach a length of about 5.25–6 mm. Adults are castaneous with a pitchy tinge. The elytron is purplish with a castaneous tinge and the antennae pitchy black, but pitchy reddish on segments 1–2.

== Biology ==
The recorded food plants are Heliconia species.
