= Javeta moultoni =

Scientific classification
- Kingdom: Animalia
- Phylum: Arthropoda
- Clade: Pancrustacea
- Class: Insecta
- Order: Coleoptera
- Suborder: Polyphaga
- Infraorder: Cucujiformia
- Family: Chrysomelidae
- Genus: Javeta
- Species: J. moultoni

Binomial name
- Javeta moultoni Weise, 1922

Species of beetle

Javeta moultoni is a species of beetle of the family Chrysomelidae. It is found in Malaysia (Sarawak).

== Biology ==
Its diet is unknown.
