= Javeta corporaali =

Scientific classification
- Kingdom: Animalia
- Phylum: Arthropoda
- Clade: Pancrustacea
- Class: Insecta
- Order: Coleoptera
- Suborder: Polyphaga
- Infraorder: Cucujiformia
- Family: Chrysomelidae
- Genus: Javeta
- Species: J. corporaali

Binomial name
- Javeta corporaali Weise, 1924

Species of beetle

Javeta corporaali is a species of beetle of the family Chrysomelidae. It is found in Indonesia (Java, Sumatra).

== Biology ==
The recorded food plant is Pinanga kuhlii.
