= Cyperispa lungae =

Scientific classification
- Kingdom: Animalia
- Phylum: Arthropoda
- Clade: Pancrustacea
- Class: Insecta
- Order: Coleoptera
- Suborder: Polyphaga
- Infraorder: Cucujiformia
- Family: Chrysomelidae
- Genus: Cyperispa
- Species: C. lungae

Binomial name
- Cyperispa lungae Gressitt, 1990

Species of beetle

Cyperispa lungae is a species of beetle of the family Chrysomelidae. It is found on the Solomon Islands (Guadalcanal).

== Description ==
Adults reach a length of about 4.1 mm. Adults are testaceous, while the pronotum and basal half of the elytron is ochraceous. The antennae are red.

== Biology ==
The food plant is unknown.
