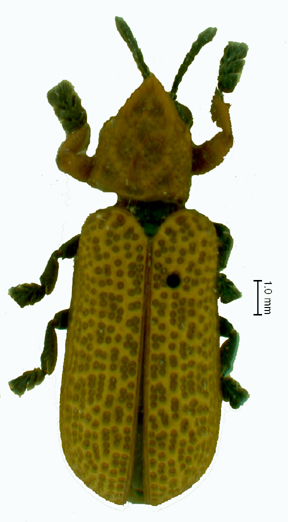

Scientific classification
- Kingdom: Animalia
- Phylum: Arthropoda
- Clade: Pancrustacea
- Class: Insecta
- Order: Coleoptera
- Suborder: Polyphaga
- Infraorder: Cucujiformia
- Family: Chrysomelidae
- Genus: Balyana
- Species: B. sculptilis

Binomial name
- Balyana sculptilis (Fairmaire, 1895)

Synonyms
- Coelaenomenodera sculptilis Fairmaire, 1895; Coelaenomenodera reticulata Gestro, 1895; Balyana algoensis Péringuey, 1898; Coelaenomenodera clathrata Kolbe, 1897; Balyana sculptilis chiromensis Berti, 1987

= Balyana sculptilis =

Species of beetle

Balyana sculptilis is a species of beetle of the family Chrysomelidae. It is found in Ethiopia, Malawi, Mozambique, Tanzania and Zimbabwe.

== Description ==
Adults reach a length of about 7.3-9.3 mm (males) and 7.8-10 mm (females). Subspecies sculptilis is uniformly yellow, while the head, antennae, underparts and middle and hind legs are black. Subspecies chiromensis is also mostly yellow, but has a black medial line on the pronotum and the elytra are bicoloured (yellow and black).

== Biology ==
The food plant is unknown.

== Subspecies ==
- Balyana sculptilis sculptilis (Mozambique)
- Balyana sculptilis chiromensis Berti, 1987 (Malawi)
- Balyana sculptilis clathrata (Kolbe, 1897) (Tanzania)
- Balyana sculptilis reticulata (Gestro, 1895) (Ethiopia)
