= Javeta manicata =

Scientific classification
- Kingdom: Animalia
- Phylum: Arthropoda
- Clade: Pancrustacea
- Class: Insecta
- Order: Coleoptera
- Suborder: Polyphaga
- Infraorder: Cucujiformia
- Family: Chrysomelidae
- Genus: Javeta
- Species: J. manicata

Binomial name
- Javeta manicata (Gestro, 1897)

Synonyms
- Distolaca manicata Gestro, 1897

Species of beetle

Javeta manicata is a species of beetle of the family Chrysomelidae. It is found in Indonesia (Java).

== Biology ==
The food plant is unknown.
