= Javeta =

Scientific classification
- Kingdom: Animalia
- Phylum: Arthropoda
- Clade: Pancrustacea
- Class: Insecta
- Order: Coleoptera
- Suborder: Polyphaga
- Infraorder: Cucujiformia
- Family: Chrysomelidae
- Subfamily: Cassidinae
- Tribe: Coelaenomenoderini
- Genus: Javeta; Baly, 1858

Synonyms
- Ekagonia Maulik, 1916

Genus of leaf beetles

Javeta is a genus of beetles belonging to the family Chrysomelidae, species are recorded from China, Indochina and (mostly) Malesia.

== Species ==
- Javeta arecae Uhmann, 1943
- Javeta breveapicalis Pic, 1934
- Javeta contracta Uhmann, 1951
- Javeta corporaali Weise, 1924
- Javeta crassicornis (Gestro, 1899)
- Javeta foveata Uhmann, 1951
- Javeta foveicollis (Gressitt, 1939)
- Javeta gestroi Weise, 1905
- Javeta kerremansi (Gestro, 1899)
- Javeta krishna Maulik, 1916
- Javeta maculata Sun, 1985
- Javeta manicata (Gestro, 1897)
- Javeta moultoni Weise, 1922
- Javeta nuda Uhmann, 1933
- Javeta pachycera (Gestro, 1909)
- Javeta pallida Baly, 1858
- Javeta palawana Uhmann, 1960
- Javeta pubicollis L. Medvedev, 2001
- Javeta thoracica Uhmann, 1955
