= Balyana armata =

Scientific classification
- Kingdom: Animalia
- Phylum: Arthropoda
- Clade: Pancrustacea
- Class: Insecta
- Order: Coleoptera
- Suborder: Polyphaga
- Infraorder: Cucujiformia
- Family: Chrysomelidae
- Genus: Balyana
- Species: B. armata

Binomial name
- Balyana armata Gestro, 1908

Species of beetle

Balyana armata is a species of beetle of the family Chrysomelidae. It is found in Madagascar.

== Description ==
This species has eight-segmented antennae. Although placed in the subgenus Balyana, the shape and punctures of the pronotum are similar to species placed in the subgenus Perrotella. It differs from Perrotella species when looking at the elytra. Here, the spaces between the spots are wider and more irregularly arranged and they continue to the apex.

== Biology ==
The food plant is unknown.
