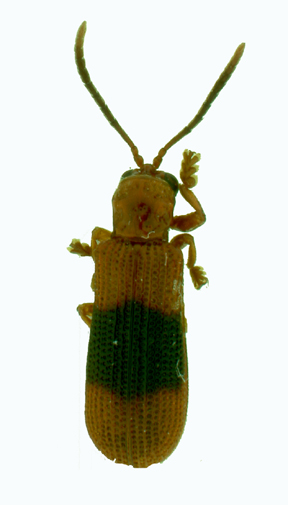

Scientific classification
- Kingdom: Animalia
- Phylum: Arthropoda
- Clade: Pancrustacea
- Class: Insecta
- Order: Coleoptera
- Suborder: Polyphaga
- Infraorder: Cucujiformia
- Family: Chrysomelidae
- Genus: Cyperispa
- Species: C. palmarum

Binomial name
- Cyperispa palmarum Gressitt, 1990

= Cyperispa palmarum =

Species of beetle

Cyperispa palmarum is a species of beetle of the family Chrysomelidae. It is found on the Solomon Islands (Santa Isabel).

== Description ==
Adults reach a length of about 5–6.8 mm. Adults are ochraceous, while the antennae are dusky and the posterior two-fifths of the elytron is blackish brown.

== Biology ==
The recorded food plants are Arecaceae species.
