= Pharangispa =

Scientific classification
- Kingdom: Animalia
- Phylum: Arthropoda
- Clade: Pancrustacea
- Class: Insecta
- Order: Coleoptera
- Suborder: Polyphaga
- Infraorder: Cucujiformia
- Family: Chrysomelidae
- Subfamily: Cassidinae
- Tribe: Coelaenomenoderini
- Genus: Pharangispa; Maulik, 1929

Genus of leaf beetles

Pharangispa is a genus of beetles belonging to the family Chrysomelidae.

== Species ==
- Pharangispa alpiniae Samuelson, 1990
- Pharangispa cristobala Gressitt, 1957
- Pharangispa fasciata Gressitt, 1957
- Pharangispa heliconiae Gressitt, 1990
- Pharangispa purpureipennis Maulik, 1929
