= Balyana ornata =

Scientific classification
- Kingdom: Animalia
- Phylum: Arthropoda
- Clade: Pancrustacea
- Class: Insecta
- Order: Coleoptera
- Suborder: Polyphaga
- Infraorder: Cucujiformia
- Family: Chrysomelidae
- Genus: Balyana
- Species: B. ornata

Binomial name
- Balyana ornata Gestro, 1908

Species of beetle

Balyana ornata is a species of beetle of the family Chrysomelidae. It is found in Madagascar.

== Description ==
Adults reach a length of about 6.74 mm (males) and 6.76 mm (females).

== Biology ==
The food plant is unknown.
