= Hypolytrum pseudomapanioides =

Conservation status
- Endangered (IUCN 3.1)

Scientific classification
- Kingdom: Plantae
- Clade: Tracheophytes
- Clade: Angiosperms
- Clade: Monocots
- Clade: Commelinids
- Order: Poales
- Family: Cyperaceae
- Genus: Hypolytrum
- Species: H. pseudomapanioides

Binomial name
- Hypolytrum pseudomapanioides D.A.Simpson & Lye

Synonyms
- Mapania pseudomapanioides (D.A.Simpson & Lye) Lye

Species of grass-like plant

Hypolytrum pseudomapanioides is a species of flowering plant in the family Cyperaceae. It is a perennial or rhizomatous geophyte endemic to the Bakossi Mountains of Cameroon's Southwest Region. It grows in undergrowth in montane tropical rain forest from 1,470 to 1,500 metres elevation. It is threatened by habitat loss.
