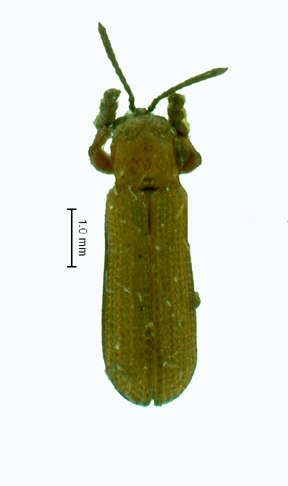

Scientific classification
- Kingdom: Animalia
- Phylum: Arthropoda
- Clade: Pancrustacea
- Class: Insecta
- Order: Coleoptera
- Suborder: Polyphaga
- Infraorder: Cucujiformia
- Family: Chrysomelidae
- Genus: Javeta
- Species: J. foveicollis

Binomial name
- Javeta foveicollis (Gressitt, 1939)

Synonyms
- Wallaceana foveicollis Gressitt, 1939

= Javeta foveicollis =

Species of beetle

Javeta foveicollis is a species of beetle of the family Chrysomelidae. It is found in China (Hainan) and Laos.

== Biology ==
The food plant is unknown.
