= Javeta thoracica =

Scientific classification
- Kingdom: Animalia
- Phylum: Arthropoda
- Clade: Pancrustacea
- Class: Insecta
- Order: Coleoptera
- Suborder: Polyphaga
- Infraorder: Cucujiformia
- Family: Chrysomelidae
- Genus: Javeta
- Species: J. thoracica

Binomial name
- Javeta thoracica Uhmann, 1955

Species of beetle

Javeta thoracica is a species of beetle of the family Chrysomelidae. It is found in Indonesia (Java).

== Biology ==
The recorded food plants are Areca and Metroxylon species.
