= Javeta pachycera =

Scientific classification
- Kingdom: Animalia
- Phylum: Arthropoda
- Clade: Pancrustacea
- Class: Insecta
- Order: Coleoptera
- Suborder: Polyphaga
- Infraorder: Cucujiformia
- Family: Chrysomelidae
- Genus: Javeta
- Species: J. pachycera

Binomial name
- Javeta pachycera (Gestro, 1909)

Synonyms
- Distolaca pachycera Gestro, 1909

Species of beetle

Javeta pachycera is a species of beetle of the family Chrysomelidae. It is found in Malaysia and Indonesia (Borneo).

== Biology ==
The food plant is unknown.
