= Bulolispa sublineata =

Scientific classification
- Kingdom: Animalia
- Phylum: Arthropoda
- Clade: Pancrustacea
- Class: Insecta
- Order: Coleoptera
- Suborder: Polyphaga
- Infraorder: Cucujiformia
- Family: Chrysomelidae
- Genus: Bulolispa
- Species: B. sublineata

Binomial name
- Bulolispa sublineata Samuelson, 1990

Species of beetle

Bulolispa sublineata is a species of beetle of the family Chrysomelidae. It is found in Papua New Guinea, where it has been recorded from lower montane areas.

== Description ==
Adults reach a length of about 3.75 mm. They are pale orange-testaceous. The elytron is marked with black at the base and on most of the basal three-fourth of the suture.

== Biology ==
The food plant is unknown.
