= Balyana pauliani =

Scientific classification
- Kingdom: Animalia
- Phylum: Arthropoda
- Clade: Pancrustacea
- Class: Insecta
- Order: Coleoptera
- Suborder: Polyphaga
- Infraorder: Cucujiformia
- Family: Chrysomelidae
- Genus: Balyana
- Species: B. pauliani

Binomial name
- Balyana pauliani Uhmann, 1954

Species of beetle

Balyana pauliani is a species of beetle of the family Chrysomelidae. It is found in Madagascar.

== Description ==
Adults are easily distinguished from other by Balyana species due to its size, colouration, and general shape.

== Biology ==
The recorded food plant is Medemia nobilis.
