= Balyana maritima =

Scientific classification
- Kingdom: Animalia
- Phylum: Arthropoda
- Clade: Pancrustacea
- Class: Insecta
- Order: Coleoptera
- Suborder: Polyphaga
- Infraorder: Cucujiformia
- Family: Chrysomelidae
- Genus: Balyana
- Species: B. maritima

Binomial name
- Balyana maritima Berti, 1987

Species of beetle

Balyana maritima is a species of beetle of the family Chrysomelidae. It is found in Madagascar.

== Description ==
Adults reach a length of about 7 mm (males) and 8.3 mm (females). The pronotum, elytron, forelegs and clypeus are yellow, while the head, antennae, scutellum, pro-, meso- and metasternum, abdomen, as well as the middle and hind legs are black.

== Biology ==
The food plant is unknown.

== Taxonomy ==
The species was already identified and names by Ghesquière in 1950, but this description was never published.
