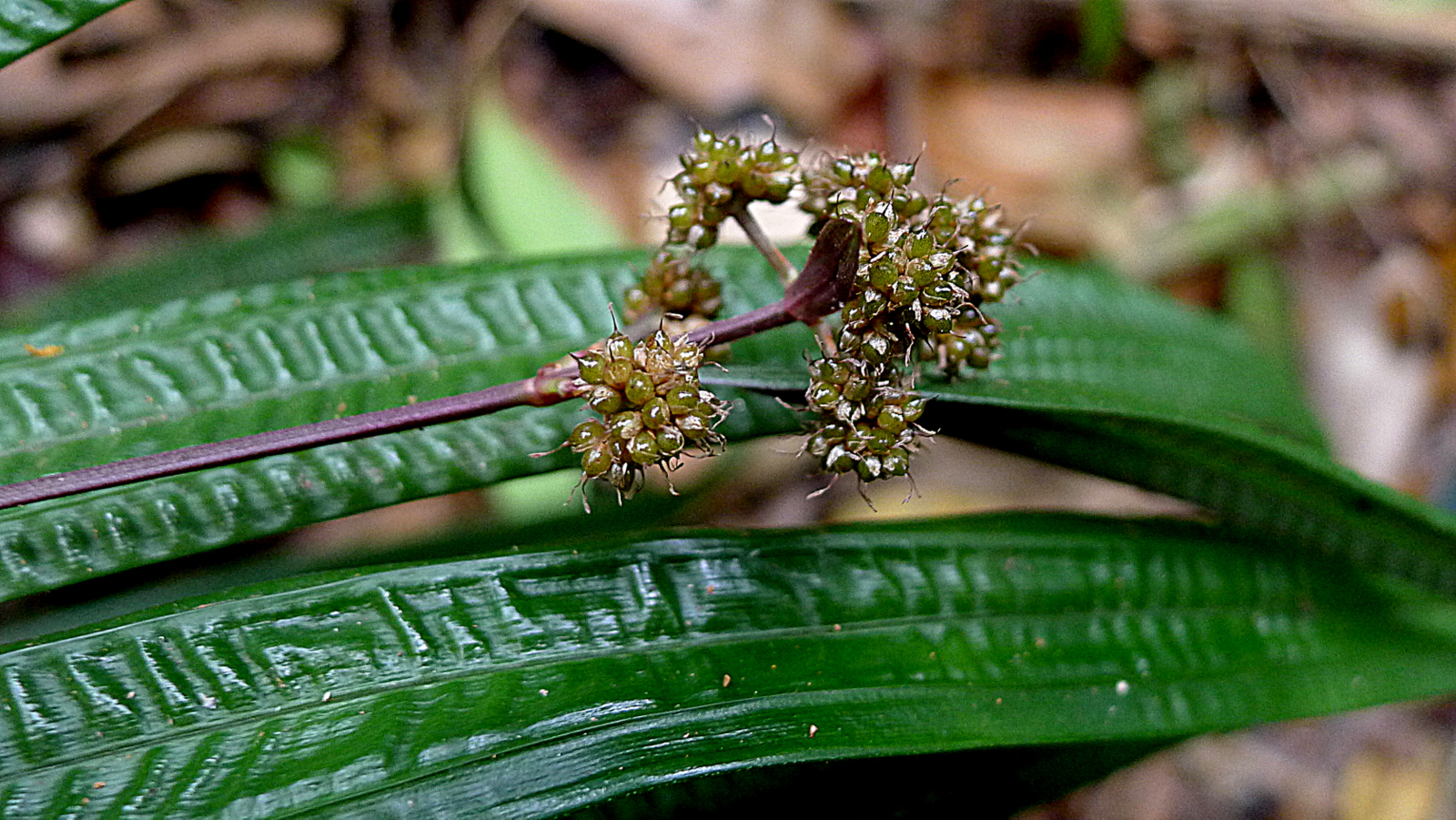
- Hypolytrum bullatum

Scientific classification
- Kingdom: Plantae
- Clade: Tracheophytes
- Clade: Angiosperms
- Clade: Monocots
- Clade: Commelinids
- Order: Poales
- Family: Cyperaceae
- Genus: Hypolytrum; Rich.

Synonyms
- Beera P.Beauv. in T.G.Lestiboudois; Tunga Roxb.; Albikia J.Presl & C.Presl

= Hypolytrum =

Genus of grass-like plants

Hypolytrum is a genus of plant in the family Cyperaceae. It contains approximately 60–70 species, native to tropical Africa, Asia, Australia, Latin America and various oceanic islands.

Species include:

- Hypolytrum amorimii
- Hypolytrum bahiense
- Hypolytrum bullatum
- Hypolytrum heterophyllum
- Hypolytrum jardimii
- Hypolytrum leptocalamum
- Hypolytrum nemorum
- Hypolytrum paraense
- Hypolytrum pseudomapanioides, D.A.Simpson & Lye in press
- Hypolytrum subcompositus, Lye & D.A.Simpson
