= Laccoptera quatuordecimnotata =

Scientific classification
- Kingdom: Animalia
- Phylum: Arthropoda
- Clade: Pancrustacea
- Class: Insecta
- Order: Coleoptera
- Suborder: Polyphaga
- Infraorder: Cucujiformia
- Family: Chrysomelidae
- Subfamily: Cassidinae
- Tribe: Aspidimorphini
- Genus: Laccoptera
- Species: L. quatuordecimnotata

Binomial name
- Laccoptera quatuordecimnotata Boheman, 1855

Synonyms
- Laccoptera (Laccoptera) quatuordecim-notata Spaeth, 1914; Laccoptera quatuordecimpunctata [sic]: Medvedev, 1957; Laccoptera (Laccopteroidea) quatuordecimnotata Borowiec, 1999

Species of beetle

Laccoptera (Laccopteroidea) quatuordecimnotata, is a species of leaf beetle native to India, and Sri Lanka.

== Description ==
Host plant are Ipomoea species, Argyreia elliptica and Argyreia hookeri. Both adult and the final instars are voracious plant eaters, that feed on upper and lower surfaces of leaf lamina. Feeding areas are parallel to the veins which give elongate-shaped holes of about 14 mm long and 4 mm wide.

Adult female lays eggs on the leaf surface. Eggs are covered in a transparent egg-case which is bound with feceal threads. Final instar grub has a flat and obovate body and is about 12 mm long. There are 16 pairs of light brownish lateral projections and a pair of supra-anal processes on the body. Head oval, dark brown. There are five large, black ocelli on each side of the head. Dorsal surface is dark brown with dense chitinous platelets. Lateral projections are covered with many spinules. Thoracic sternites and first, second abdominal sternites are all whitish yellow. These sternites lack chitinous platelets. Antenna with 2 segments. Prothorax with a pair of large subpentagonal black shields. It bears a large triangular mass of feces on the cast skins of the preceding four larval instars.

Pupation occur within the cover made of cast skins and feces. Pupa with long oval and glabrous body which is about 12 mm long. Dorsal surface light brownish with some black patches. Head dark brown in color. Pronotum flat, and depressed anteriorly. Mesothorax and metathorax areas with dark patches. Elytral area is dark brown.
