= Laccoptera nepalensis =

Scientific classification
- Kingdom: Animalia
- Phylum: Arthropoda
- Clade: Pancrustacea
- Class: Insecta
- Order: Coleoptera
- Suborder: Polyphaga
- Infraorder: Cucujiformia
- Family: Chrysomelidae
- Genus: Laccoptera
- Species: L. nepalensis

Binomial name
- Laccoptera nepalensis Boheman, 1855

Synonyms
- Cassida quadrimaculata Thunberg, 1789; Laccoptera chinensis Fabricius, 1798; Laccoptera thunbergi Spaeth, 1914a

Species of beetle

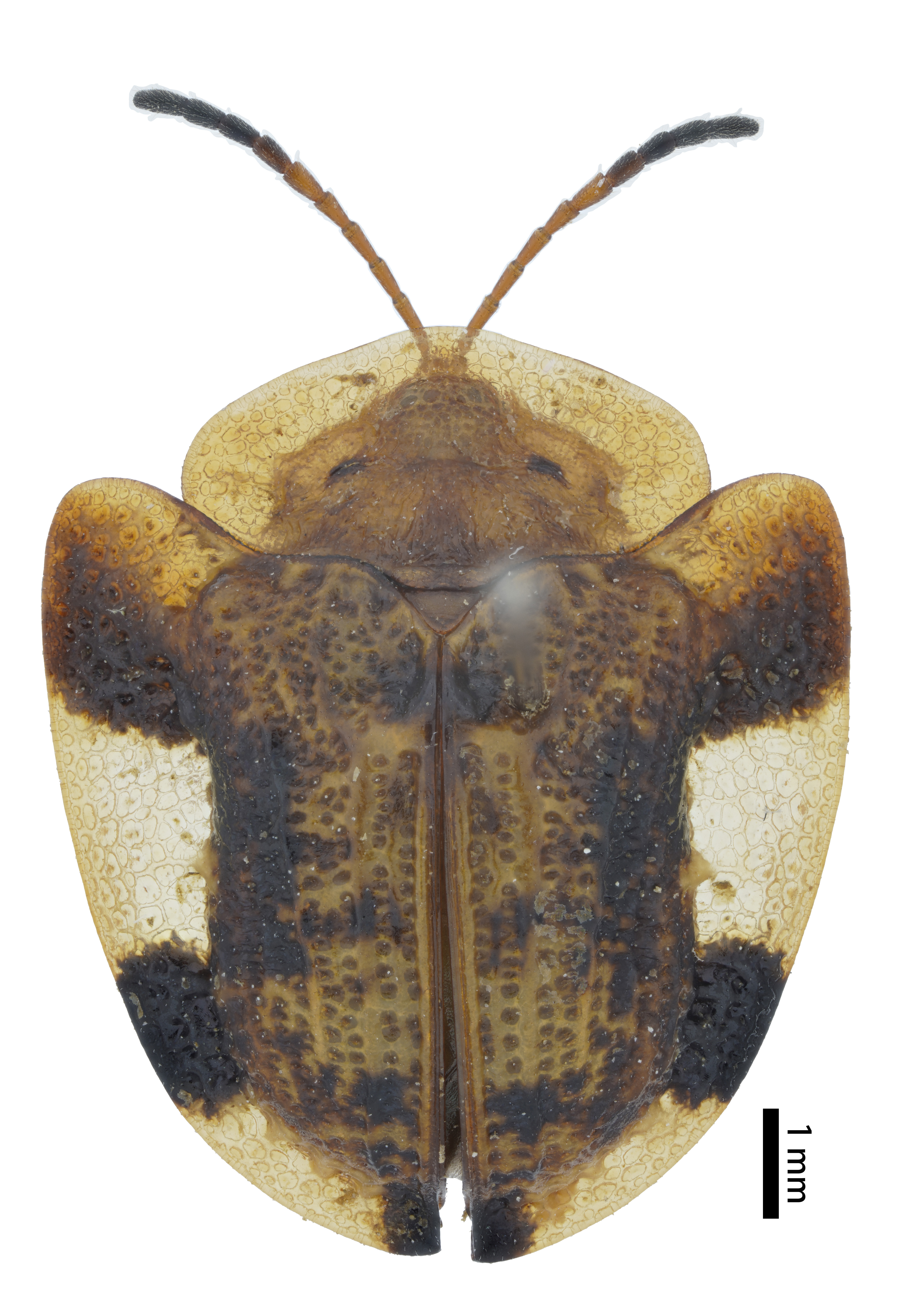
Laccoptera nepalensis

Laccoptera nepalensis is a species of beetle of the Chrysomelidae family. This species is found in China (Fujian, Guangdong, Guangxi, Guizhou, Hainan, Hubei, Hunan, Jiangsu, Jiangxi, Liaoning, Sichuan, Yunnan, Zhejiang), Taiwan, India, Indonesia, Japan, Laos, Malaysia, Myanmar, Nepal, Pakistan, Singapore, Thailand and Vietnam.

Adults have a triangular body. The pronotum yellowish-brown or brown, usually with two small black spots. The ground colour of the elytral disc is yellowish-brown or brown. The disc has a number of spots.
