= Nilgiraspis =

Scientific classification
- Kingdom: Animalia
- Phylum: Arthropoda
- Clade: Pancrustacea
- Class: Insecta
- Order: Coleoptera
- Suborder: Polyphaga
- Infraorder: Cucujiformia
- Family: Chrysomelidae
- Subfamily: Cassidinae
- Tribe: Aspidimorphini
- Genus: Nilgiraspis; Spaeth, 1932
- Species: N. andrewesi

Binomial name
- Nilgiraspis andrewesi (Spaeth, 1932)

Synonyms
- Aspidomorpha andrewesi Spaeth, 1932

Genus of beetles

Nilgiraspis is a genus of leaf beetles in the family Chrysomelidae. It is monotypic, being represented by the single species, Nilgiraspis andrewesi, which is found in southern India, China (Yunnan), Laos and north-western Thailand.
