= Mahatsinia =

Scientific classification
- Kingdom: Animalia
- Phylum: Arthropoda
- Clade: Pancrustacea
- Class: Insecta
- Order: Coleoptera
- Suborder: Polyphaga
- Infraorder: Cucujiformia
- Family: Chrysomelidae
- Subfamily: Cassidinae
- Tribe: Aspidimorphini
- Genus: Mahatsinia; Spaeth, 1919
- Species: M. nodulosa

Binomial name
- Mahatsinia nodulosa (Weise, 1910)

Synonyms
- Laccoptera nodulosa Weise, 1910

Genus of beetles

Mahatsinia is a genus of leaf beetles in the family Chrysomelidae. It is monotypic, being represented by the single species, Mahatsinia nodulosa, which is found in central and eastern Madagascar.

== Description ==
Adults reach a length of about 5.3–5.5 mm. The pronotum is yellow with a black disc black. The elytral disc is also black, with yellow elevations.

== Life history ==
No host plant has been documented for this species.
