= Conchyloctenia =

Scientific classification
- Kingdom: Animalia
- Phylum: Arthropoda
- Clade: Pancrustacea
- Class: Insecta
- Order: Coleoptera
- Suborder: Polyphaga
- Infraorder: Cucujiformia
- Family: Chrysomelidae
- Subfamily: Cassidinae
- Tribe: Aspidimorphini
- Genus: Conchyloctenia; Spaeth, 1902

Synonyms
- Aspidomorpha (Conchyloctenia) Spaeth, 1902

Genus of leaf beetles

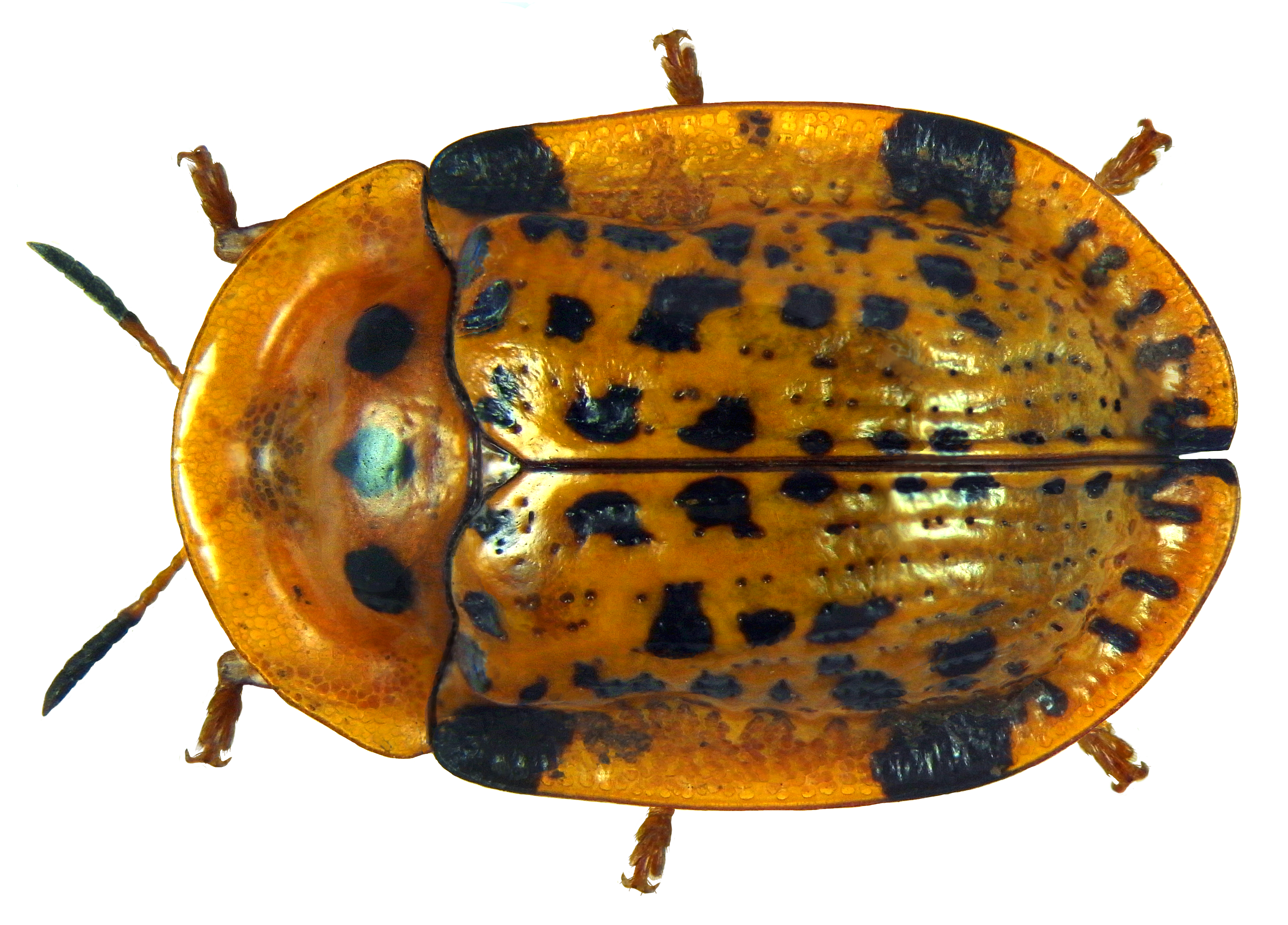
Conchyloctenia tripuncticollis

Conchyloctenia is a genus of leaf beetles of the family Chrysomelidae.

== Species ==
- Conchyloctenia adspersa (Fabricius, 1801)
- Conchyloctenia aruwimiensis (Gorham, 1892)
- Conchyloctenia aspidiformis Borowiec, 1994
- Conchyloctenia bipuncticollis (Boheman, 1854)
- Conchyloctenia bonnyana (Gorham, 1892)
- Conchyloctenia capensis Świętojańska et Borowiec, 2002
- Conchyloctenia fibrata Spaeth, 1912
- Conchyloctenia hepatica (Boheman, 1854)
- Conchyloctenia hybrida (Boheman, 1854)
- Conchyloctenia illota (Boheman, 1854)
- Conchyloctenia mouffleti (Boheman, 1854)
- Conchyloctenia multimaculata Spaeth, 1917
- Conchyloctenia nigrovittata (Boheman, 1854)
- Conchyloctenia praecox (Boheman, 1854)
- Conchyloctenia punctata (Fabricius, 1787)
- Conchyloctenia signatipennis (Boheman, 1854)
- Conchyloctenia tripuncticollis (Boheman, 1862)
