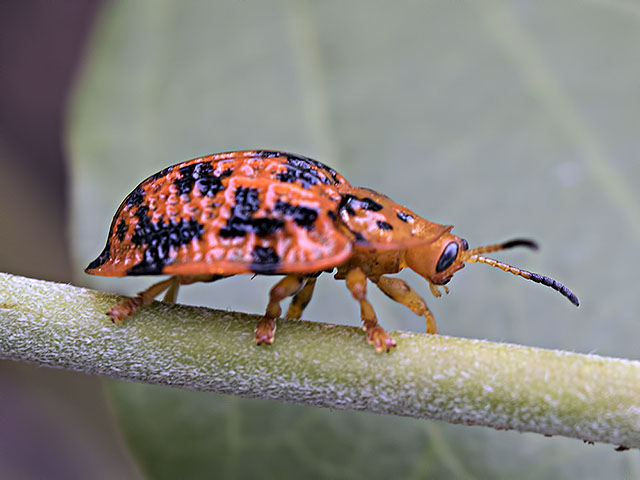
- Laccoptera sulcata, India

Scientific classification
- Kingdom: Animalia
- Phylum: Arthropoda
- Clade: Pancrustacea
- Class: Insecta
- Order: Coleoptera
- Suborder: Polyphaga
- Infraorder: Cucujiformia
- Family: Chrysomelidae
- Subfamily: Cassidinae
- Tribe: Aspidimorphini
- Genus: Laccoptera; Boheman, 1855

Synonyms
- Asphalesia Weise, 1899; Eulaccoptera Hincks, 1952; Indocassis Spaeth, 1952; Laccopteroidea Spaeth, 1952; Orphnoda Weise, 1899; Orphnodella Spaeth, 1902; Orphnodina Spaeth, 1932; Orphonoda Borowiec, 1992; Orphonodella Borowiec, 1992; Orphonodina Borowiec, 1992; Parorphnoda Spaeth, 1932; Patrisma Fairmaire, 1891; Sindia Weise, 1897; Sindiola Spaeth, 1903; Sindiolina Swietojanska, 2001

= Laccoptera =

Genus of beetles

Laccoptera is a genus of tortoise beetles in the family Chrysomelidae. There are more than 60 described species in Laccoptera. They are found in Africa, south and east Asia, and Australia.

== Species ==
These 67 species belong to the genus Laccoptera:

- Laccoptera atrata Spaeth, 1905
- Laccoptera aurosa Fairmaire, 1891
- Laccoptera basalis Weise, 1899
- Laccoptera bicolor Spaeth, 1937
- Laccoptera brancsiki Spaeth, 1919
- Laccoptera burmensis (Spaeth, 1938)
- Laccoptera burorum (Spaeth, 1902)
- Laccoptera caduca Borowiec, 1994
- Laccoptera cancellata Boheman, 1855
- Laccoptera cheni Swietojanska, 2001
- Laccoptera cicatricosa (Boheman, 1855)
- Laccoptera confragosa Weise, 1899
- Laccoptera corrugata (Sahlberg, 1823)
- Laccoptera depressa Swietojanska, 2001
- Laccoptera deremensis Weise, 1899
- Laccoptera discreta Boheman, 1855
- Laccoptera distans (Spaeth, 1902)
- Laccoptera excavata Boheman, 1855
- Laccoptera fallax Weise, 1910
- Laccoptera fasciata Boheman, 1862
- Laccoptera foveolata (Boheman, 1856)
- Laccoptera fruhstorferi Spaeth, 1905
- Laccoptera hospita Boheman, 1855
- Laccoptera impressa (Boheman, 1853)
- Laccoptera intertexta Boheman, 1862
- Laccoptera jawalagiriana (Spaeth, 1936)
- Laccoptera kapiriana Spaeth, 1932
- Laccoptera meghalayaensis Swietojanska, 2001
- Laccoptera montivaga Spaeth, 1909
- Laccoptera multinotata Boheman, 1855
- Laccoptera murrayi Boheman, 1862
- Laccoptera nepalensis Boheman, 1855
- Laccoptera nigricornis Wagener, 1877
- Laccoptera novemdecimnotata Boheman, 1855
- Laccoptera nunbergi Borowiec, 1994
- Laccoptera obscuromaculata Borowiec, 2010
- Laccoptera pallicolor (Fairmaire, 1901)
- Laccoptera parallelipennis (Spaeth, 1903)
- Laccoptera permodica (Boheman, 1862)
- Laccoptera perrieri Fairmaire, 1898
- Laccoptera picea Boheman, 1855
- Laccoptera prominens Chen & Zia, 1964
- Laccoptera quatuordecimnotata Boheman, 1855
- Laccoptera regularis Fairmaire, 1898
- Laccoptera rotundicollis Borowiec, 1997
- Laccoptera rubricollis Spaeth, 1932
- Laccoptera rugicollis Thomson, 1858
- Laccoptera ruginosa Boheman, 1855
- Laccoptera rugosicollis (Spaeth, 1902)
- Laccoptera rustica (Weise, 1899)
- Laccoptera salebra Spaeth, 1924
- Laccoptera sassana Spaeth, 1912
- Laccoptera schultzei Spaeth, 1913
- Laccoptera sculpturata Boheman, 1855
- Laccoptera sedecimmaculata (Boheman, 1856)
- Laccoptera sedecimnotata Boheman, 1862
- Laccoptera spectrum Boheman, 1855
- Laccoptera sulcata (Olivier, 1808)
- Laccoptera sutteri Hincks, 1953
- Laccoptera tredecimguttata Wagener, 1877
- Laccoptera tredecimpunctata (Fabricius, 1801)
- Laccoptera triangula Spaeth, 1912
- Laccoptera undulata (Spaeth, 1919)
- Laccoptera vigintisexnotata Boheman, 1855
- Laccoptera weisei (Spaeth, 1902)
- Laccoptera yunnanica Spaeth, 1914
- Laccoptera zambesiaca Spaeth, 1919
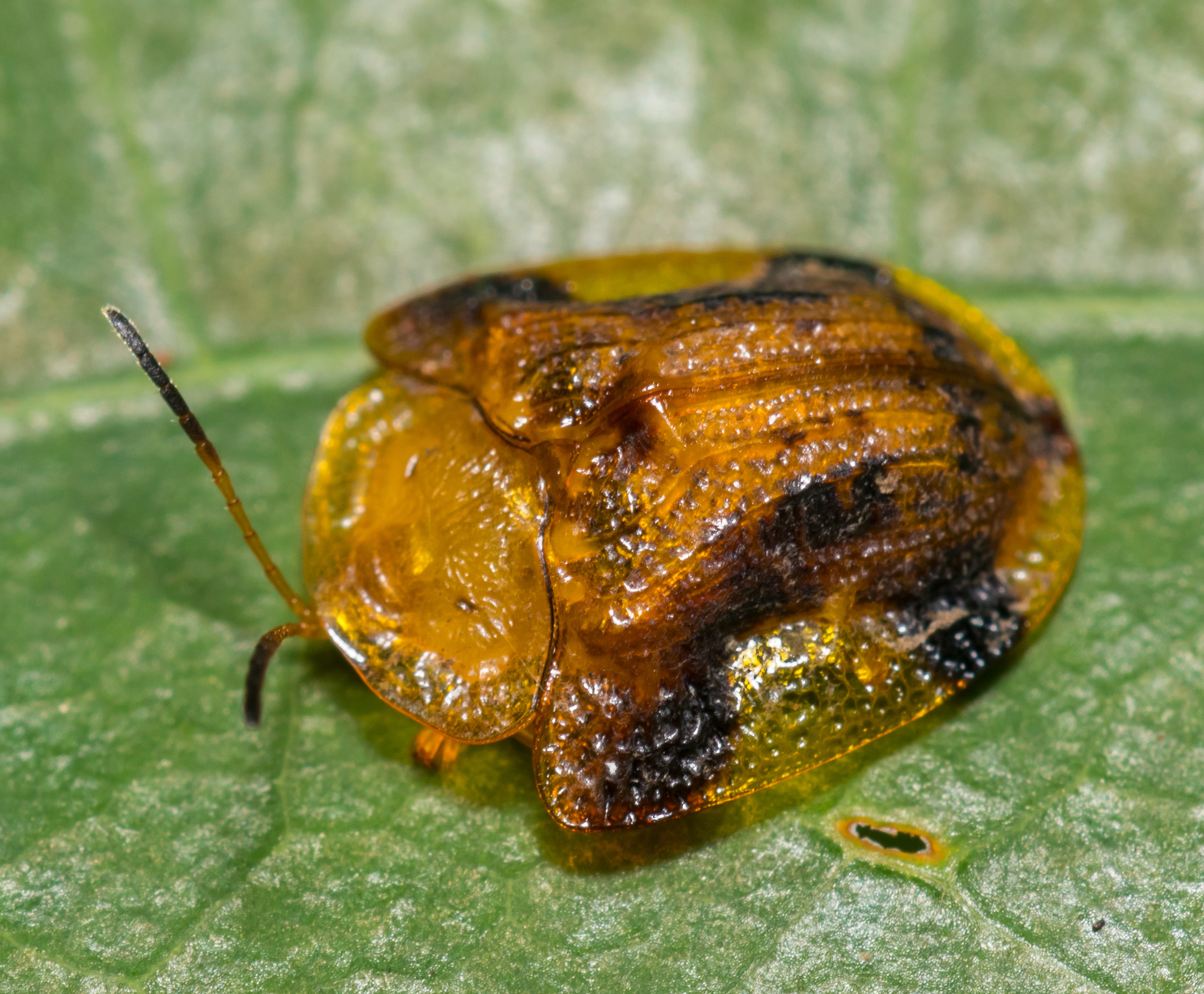
Laccoptera nepalensis, Hong Kong

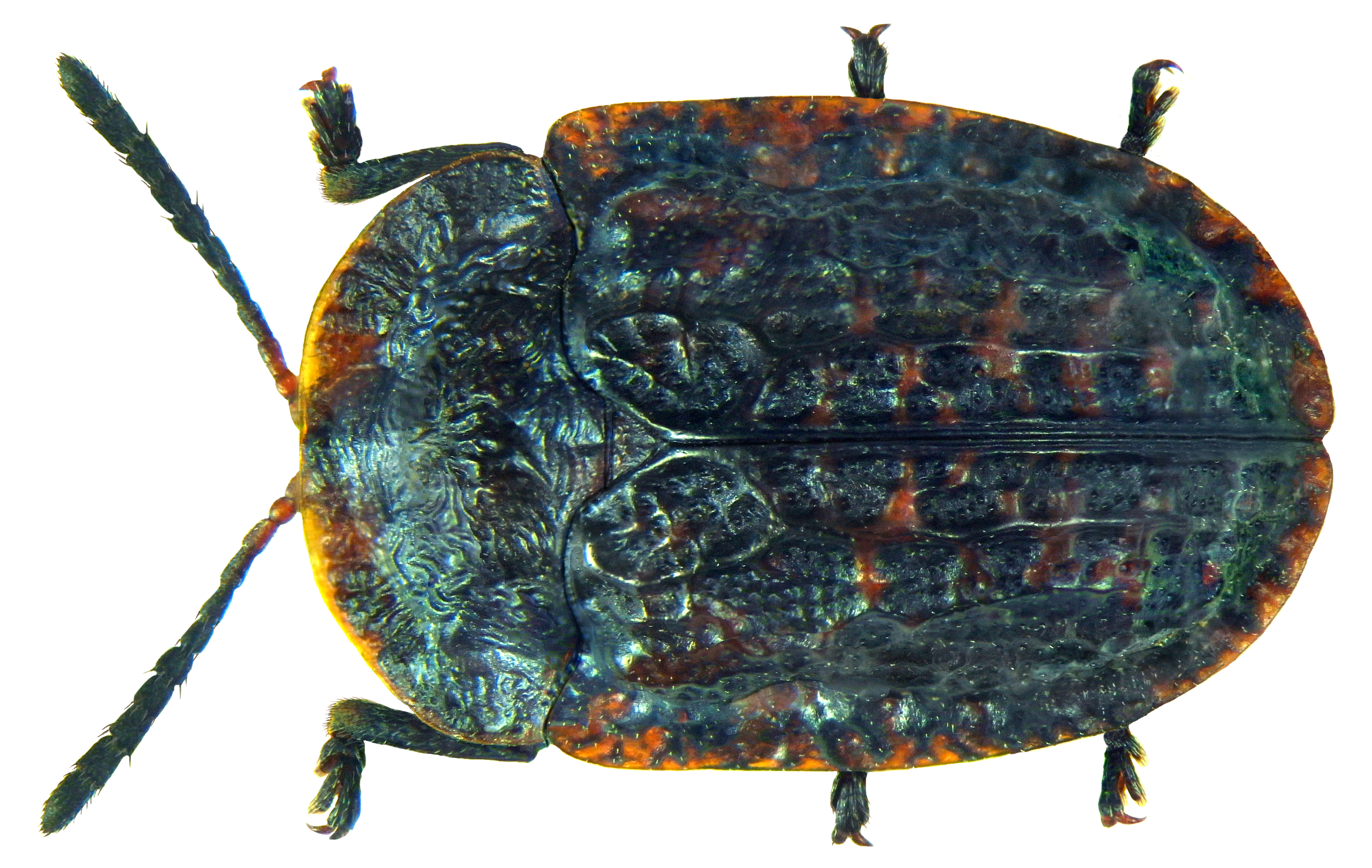
Laccoptera cicatricosa, Kenya

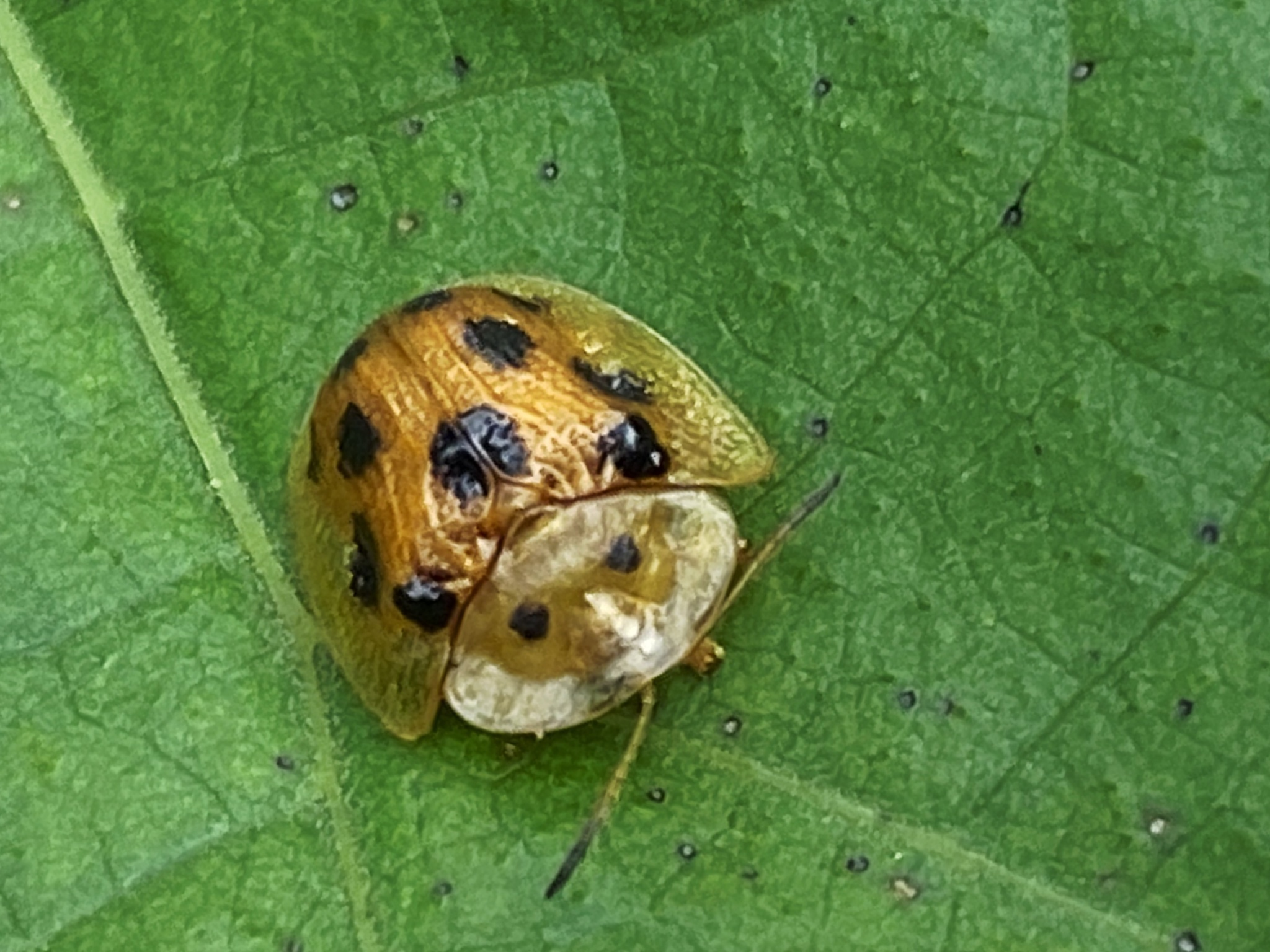
Laccoptera tredecimguttata, Philippines

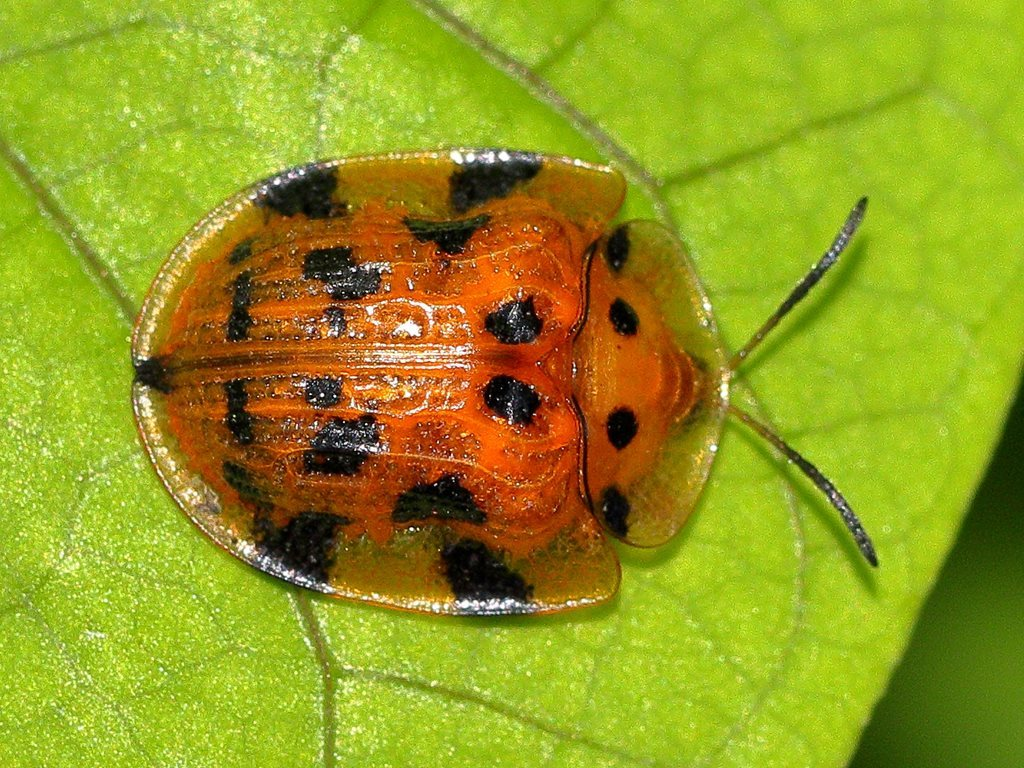
Laccoptera impressa, Australia

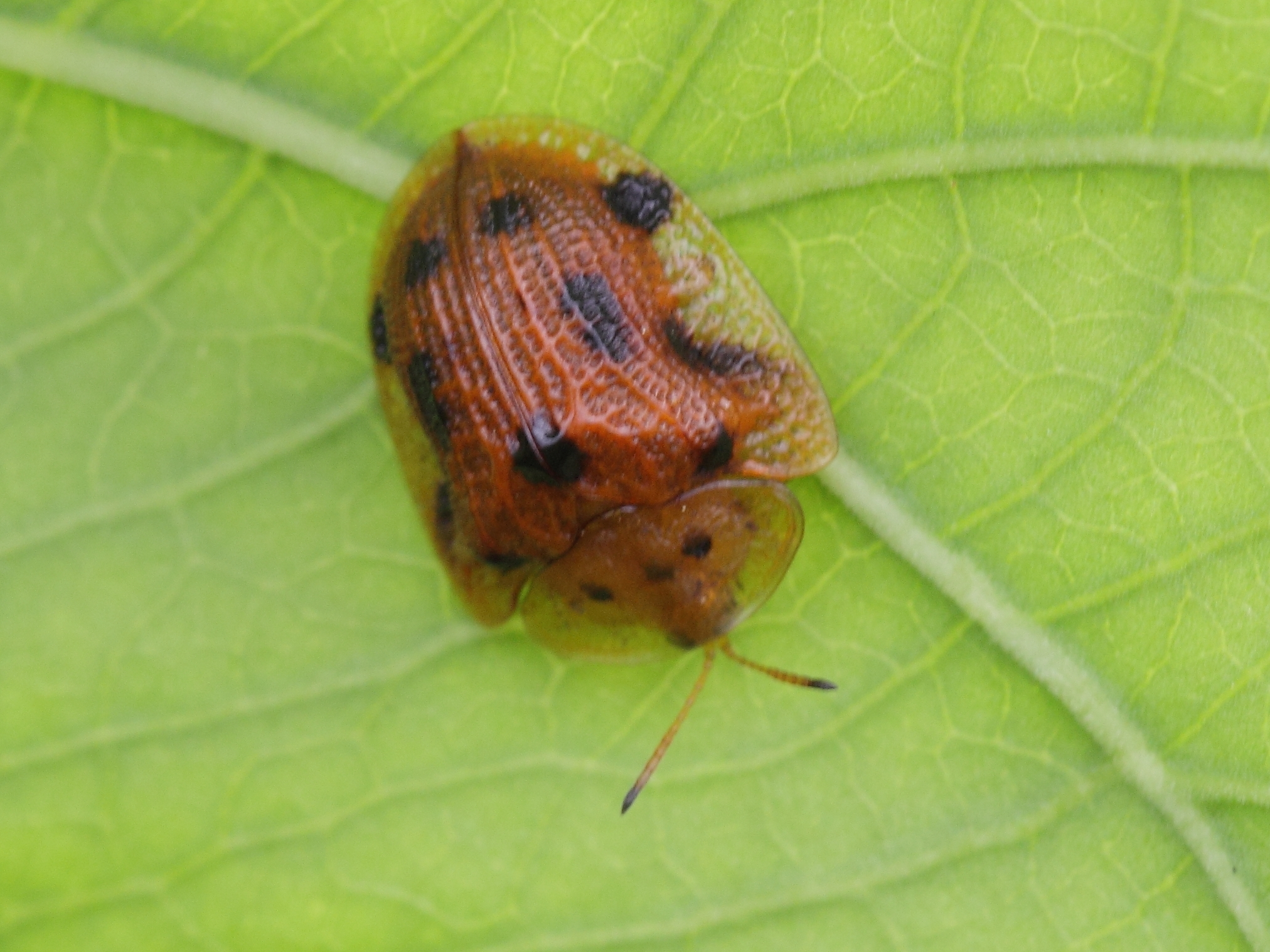
Laccoptera tredecimpunctata, Indonesia

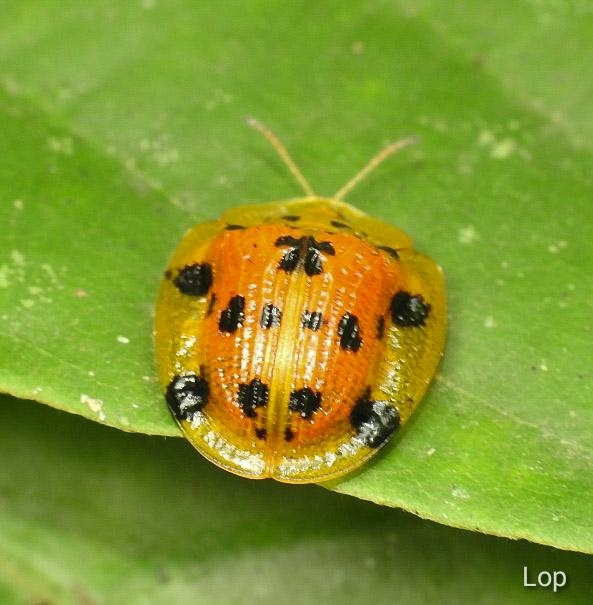
Laccoptera vigintisexnotata, India

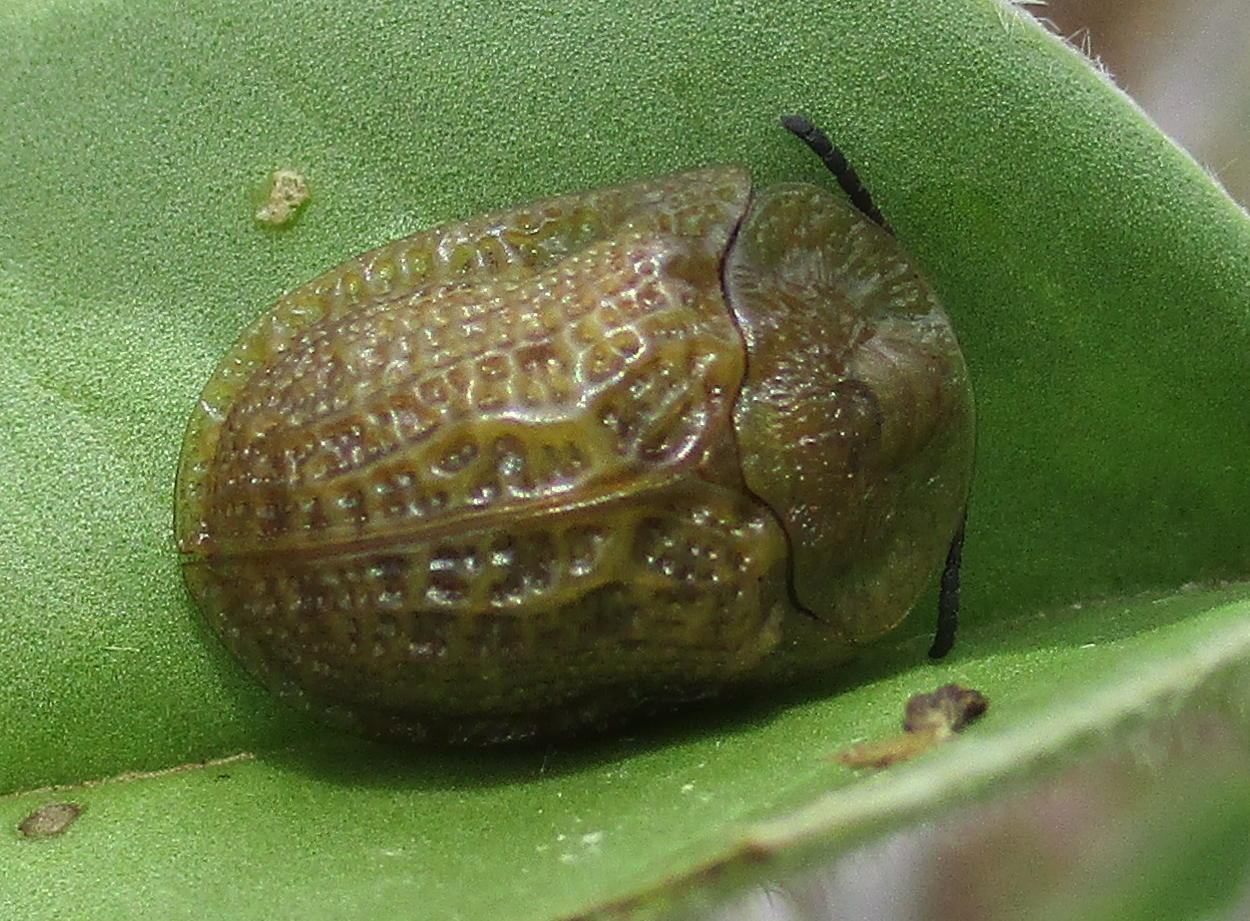
Laccoptera rugosicollis, Botswana

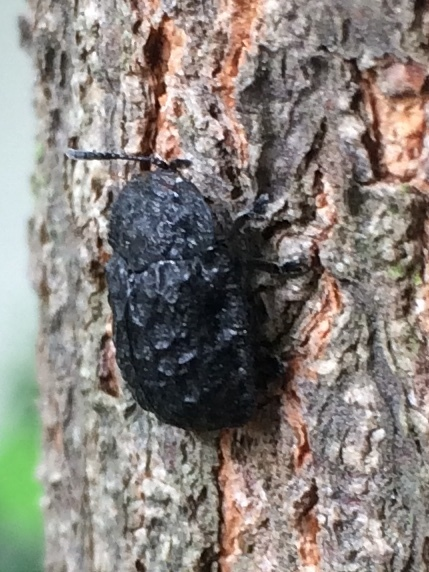
Laccoptera foveolata, India

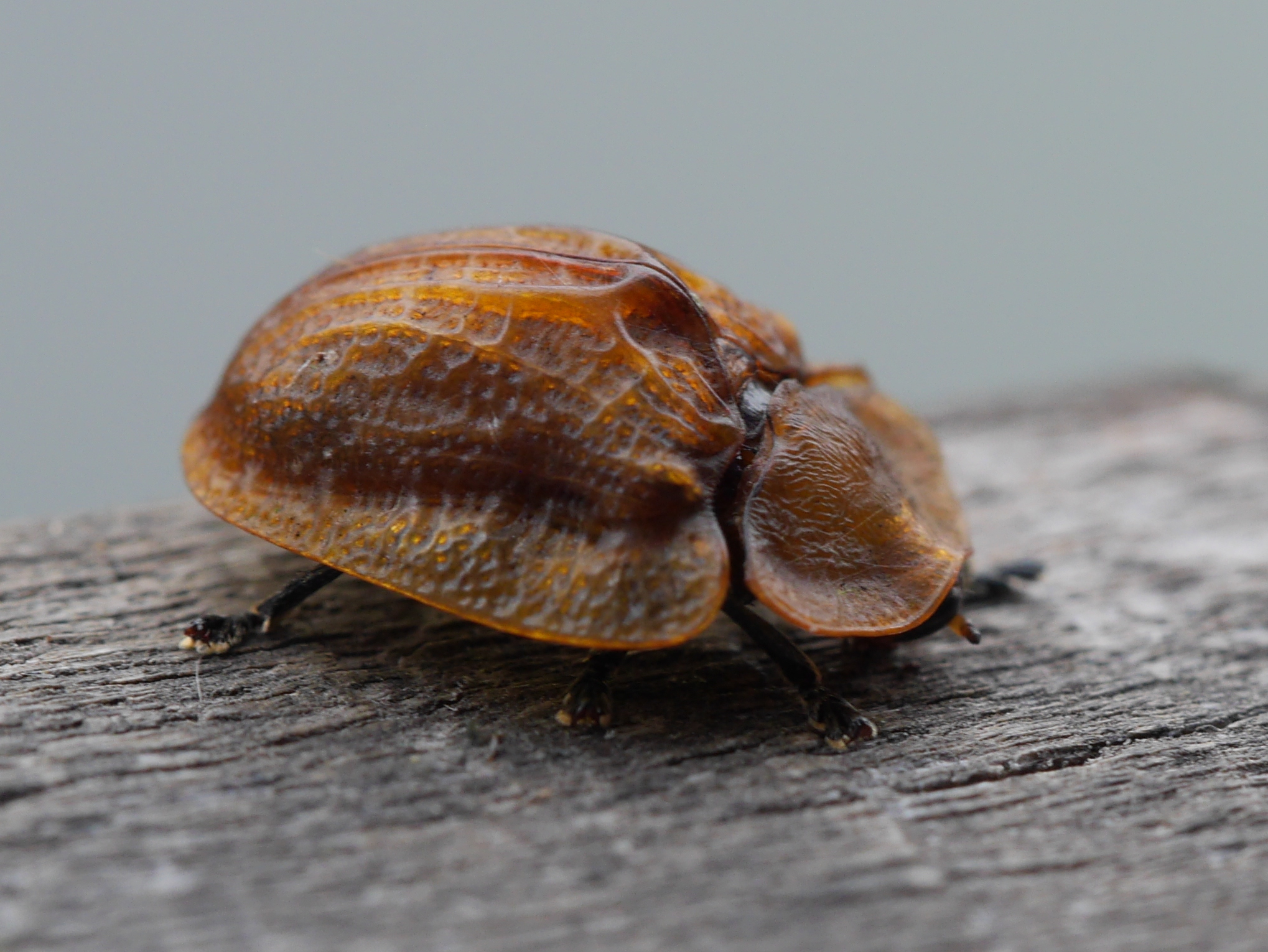
Laccoptera corrugata, Congo

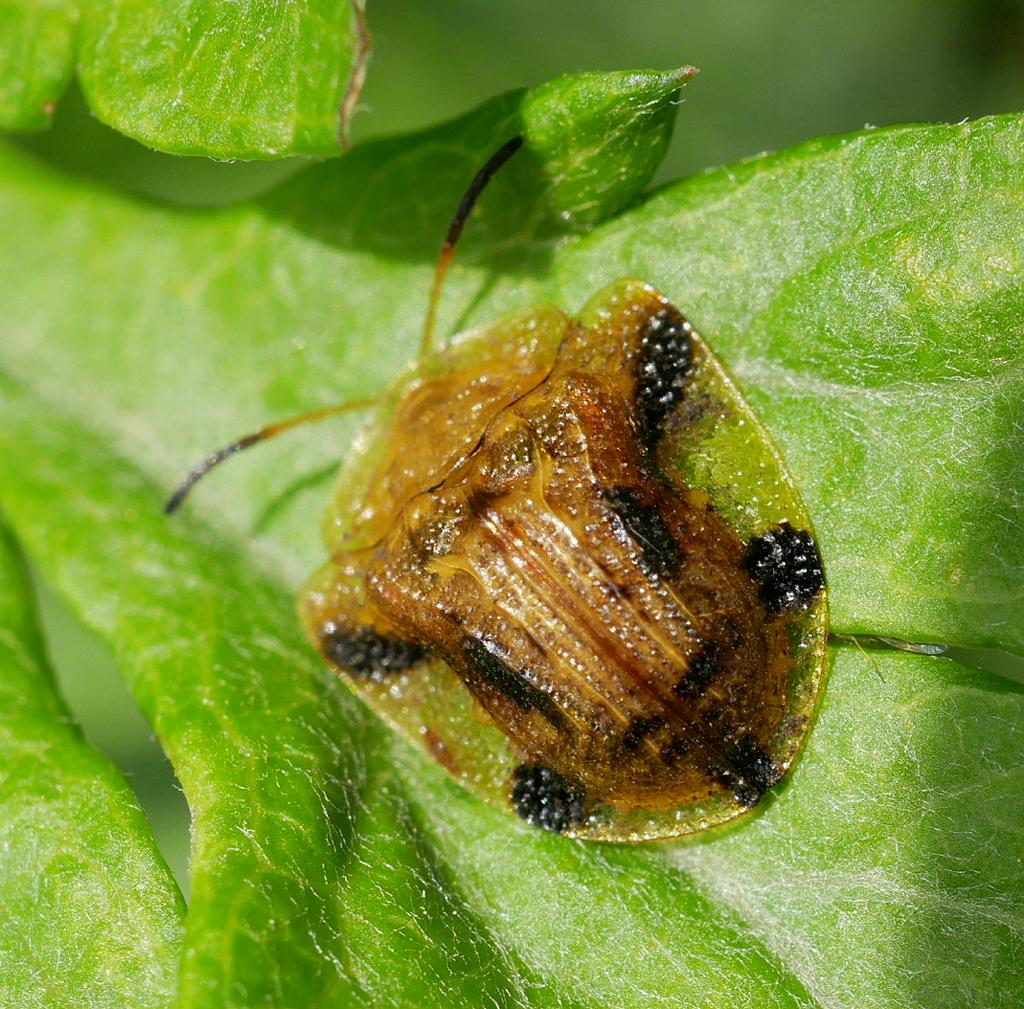
Laccoptera nepalensis, Japan
