= Hybosinota =

Scientific classification
- Kingdom: Animalia
- Phylum: Arthropoda
- Clade: Pancrustacea
- Class: Insecta
- Order: Coleoptera
- Suborder: Polyphaga
- Infraorder: Cucujiformia
- Family: Chrysomelidae
- Subfamily: Cassidinae
- Tribe: Aspidimorphini
- Genus: Hybosinota; Spaeth, 1909

Genus of leaf beetles

Hybosinota is a genus of leaf beetles of the family Chrysomelidae.

== Species ==
- Hybosinota nodulosa (Boheman, 1854)
- Hybosinota turrigera (Boheman, 1862)
