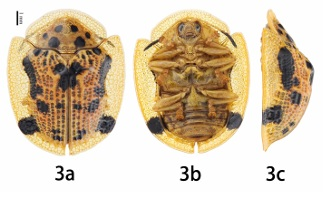

Scientific classification
- Kingdom: Animalia
- Phylum: Arthropoda
- Clade: Pancrustacea
- Class: Insecta
- Order: Coleoptera
- Suborder: Polyphaga
- Infraorder: Cucujiformia
- Family: Chrysomelidae
- Genus: Laccoptera
- Species: L. hospita

Binomial name
- Laccoptera hospita Boheman, 1855

Synonyms
- Laccoptera vigintisexnotata puncticolle Gressitt, 1938

= Laccoptera hospita =

Species of beetle

Laccoptera hospita is a species of beetle of the Chrysomelidae family. This species is found in China (Guangdong, Guangxi, Guizhou, Hainan, Sichuan, Yunnan), Cambodia, Laos, Thailand and Vietnam.

Adults reach a length of about 8.7-9.2 mm. Adults have a triangular body. The pronotum is yellow or yellowish-brown with six spots. The elytral disc is yellow or yellowish-brown with a fairly constant pattern composed of a spot, sometimes divided into four smaller spots.
