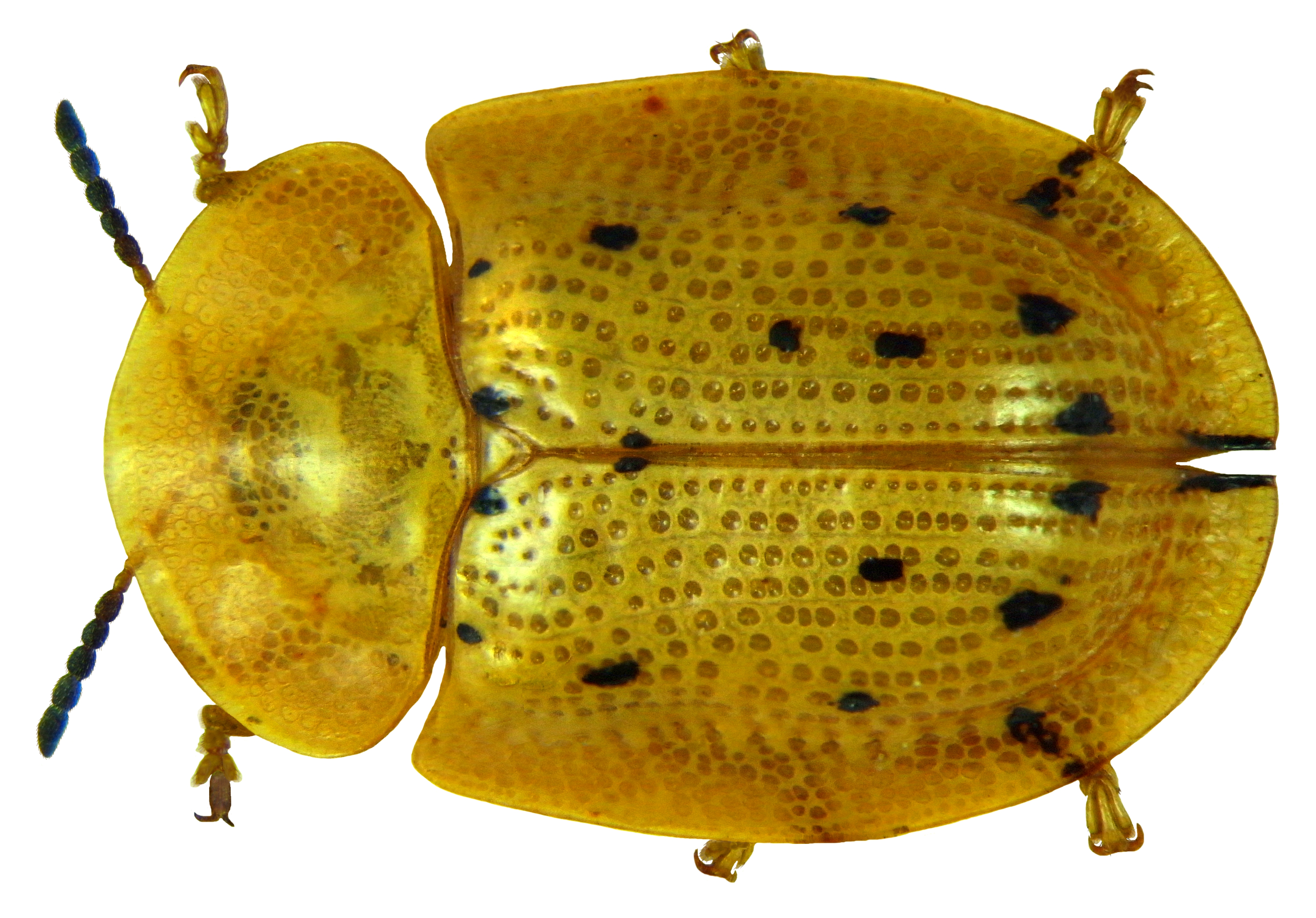
- Aspidimorpha nigromaculata

Scientific classification
- Kingdom: Animalia
- Phylum: Arthropoda
- Clade: Pancrustacea
- Class: Insecta
- Order: Coleoptera
- Suborder: Polyphaga
- Infraorder: Cucujiformia
- Family: Chrysomelidae
- Subfamily: Cassidinae
- Tribe: Aspidimorphini; Chapuis, 1875

Genera
- see text

= Aspidimorphini =

Tribe of leaf beetles

Aspidimorphini is a tribe of leaf beetles within the subfamily Cassidinae. Aspidimorphini is closely related to the tribe Cassidini. In a 2017 cladistic analysis of Cassidini based on morphological characters, Aspidimorphini was found to be nested within Cassidini, leading the authors of the study to formally synonymize the former with the latter.

== Genera ==
1. Aspidimorpha Hope, 1840 - Africa, Europe, Asia, Australia
2. Conchyloctenia Spaeth, 1902 - Africa, India
3. Hybosinota Spaeth, 1909 - southern Africa
4. Laccoptera Boheman, 1855 - Africa, Asia, Australia
5. Mahatsinia Spaeth, 1919 - monotypic: Madagascar
6. Nilgiraspis Spaeth, 1932 - monotypic: southern Asia
