= Pentispa =

Scientific classification
- Kingdom: Animalia
- Phylum: Arthropoda
- Clade: Pancrustacea
- Class: Insecta
- Order: Coleoptera
- Suborder: Polyphaga
- Infraorder: Cucujiformia
- Family: Chrysomelidae
- Tribe: Chalepini
- Genus: Pentispa; Chapuis, 1875

Genus of beetles

Pentispa is a genus of tortoise beetles and hispines in the family Chrysomelidae. There are more than 20 described species in Pentispa.

== Species ==
These species belong to the genus Pentispa:

- Pentispa aequatoriana Weise, 1910
- Pentispa atrocaerulea (Champion, 1894)
- Pentispa beata (Baly, 1886)
- Pentispa bilimeki Spaeth, 1937
- Pentispa bivittaticollis (Baly, 1885)
- Pentispa candezei (Chapuis, 1877)
- Pentispa chevrolati (Chapuis, 1877)
- Pentispa clarkella (Baly, 1886)
- Pentispa collaris (Thunberg, 1805)
- Pentispa distincta (Baly, 1886)
- Pentispa fairmairei (Chapuis, 1877)
- Pentispa geniculata Pic, 1932
- Pentispa melanura (Chapuis, 1877)
- Pentispa perroudi Pic, 1933
- Pentispa pratti Pic, 1932
- Pentispa sallaei (Baly, 1886)
- Pentispa sanguinipennis (Baly, 1886)
- Pentispa sulcifrons (Champion, 1894)
- Pentispa suturalis (Baly, 1885)
- Pentispa vittatipennis (Baly, 1886)
- Pentispa viturati Pic, 1932

== Former species ==
- Pentispa amplipennis Uhmann, 1930
- Pentispa cristata (Chapuis, 1877)
- Pentispa emarginata (Chapuis, 1877)
- Pentispa explanata (Chapuis, 1877)
- Pentispa morio (Fabricius, 1801)
- Pentispa parumpunctata Weise, 1910
