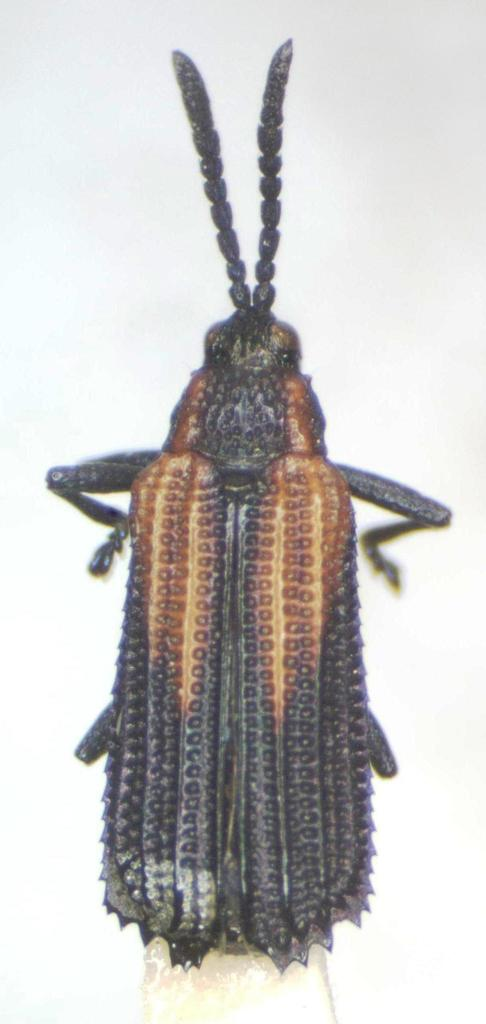

Scientific classification
- Kingdom: Animalia
- Phylum: Arthropoda
- Class: Insecta
- Order: Coleoptera
- Suborder: Polyphaga
- Infraorder: Cucujiformia
- Family: Chrysomelidae
- Genus: Pentispa
- Species: P. fairmairei

Binomial name
- Pentispa fairmairei (Chapuis, 1877)

Synonyms
- Uroplata (Pentispa) fairmairei Chapuis, 1877; Uroplata guatemalensis Donckier, 1899; Uroplata (Pentispa) rodriguezi Chapuis, 1877; Uroplata (Pentispa) subvirens Chapuis, 1877

= Pentispa fairmairei =

Species of beetle

Pentispa fairmairei is a species of beetle of the family Chrysomelidae. It is found in Belize, Colombia, Costa Rica, El Salvador, Guatemala, Mexico (Mexico City, Chiapas, Jalisco, Veracruz), Nicaragua and Panama

== Description ==
The head is black-aeneous or black, with the vertex and front deeply trisulcate and the clypeus semilunate, piceous, its upper margin free. The antennae are longer than the head and thorax. The thorax is transverse, the sides obtusely angulate, the upper surface excavated behind the middle, closely and deeply punctured. On either side, just within the lateral margin, is a broad, torulose, impunctate, fulvous vitta. The elytra are oblong, with the lateral margin serrulate, the apical one irregularly notched, emarginate at the sutural angle, strongly serrulate. Each elytron has eight regular rows of punctures, the second, fourth, and sixth interspaces, together with the suture, strongly costate.

== Biology ==
The recorded food plants are Chusquea species, Calea urticaefolia, Calea axillaries, Vernonia mollis, Verbesina species, Eupatorium populifolium, Clibadium species, Ageratina adenophora, Elephantopus spicatus, Malpighia glabra, Serjania species and Lepidaptoa tortuosa.
