= Pentispa sulcifrons =

Scientific classification
- Kingdom: Animalia
- Phylum: Arthropoda
- Class: Insecta
- Order: Coleoptera
- Suborder: Polyphaga
- Infraorder: Cucujiformia
- Family: Chrysomelidae
- Genus: Pentispa
- Species: P. sulcifrons

Binomial name
- Pentispa sulcifrons (Champion, 1894)

Synonyms
- Uroplata sulcifrons Champion, 1894

Species of beetle

Pentispa sulcifrons is a species of beetle of the family Chrysomelidae. It is found in Mexico (Yucatan).

== Description ==
Adults are similar to Pentispa vittatipennis, but less elongate and with the fourth elytral interspace not so strongly costate, the fulvous patch obliquely truncate behind. In P. vittatipennis, the third and fourth rows of punctures are fused into one in the median third of the elytra, while in P. sulcifrons they are separate throughout.

== Biology ==
The recorded food plant is Melanthera nivea.
