= Urolepis =

Urolepis may refer to:

- Urolepis (plant), a flowering plant genus in the family Asteraceae
- Urolepis (wasp), a wasp genus in the family Pteromalidae
