= Pentispa distincta =

Scientific classification
- Kingdom: Animalia
- Phylum: Arthropoda
- Clade: Pancrustacea
- Class: Insecta
- Order: Coleoptera
- Suborder: Polyphaga
- Infraorder: Cucujiformia
- Family: Chrysomelidae
- Genus: Pentispa
- Species: P. distincta

Binomial name
- Pentispa distincta (Baly, 1886)

Synonyms
- Uroplata distincta Baly, 1885

Species of beetle

Pentispa distincta is a species of leaf beetle in the family Chrysomelidae. It is found in the United States (Texas), Guatemala and Mexico.

== Description ==
Adults reach a length of about 4.5-5.2 mm. The vertex and front are deeply sulcate and the clypeus is transverse, produced, its upper edge subangulate. The antennae are nearly half the length of the body, slightly thickened towards the apex. The thorax is transverse, subconic, the sides converging from the base to the apex, obsoletely angulate. The disc is coarsely and closely punctured, with a broad submarginal torulose, impunctate vitta on either side, fulvous. The elytra are subparallel, very slightly increasing in width towards the apex, the latter rounded, broadly subquadrate-emarginate at the suture, the lateral margin finely, the apical one more strongly and somewhat irregularly, serrulate. Each elytron has eight, at the extreme base with nine, regular rows of punctures. The second, fourth, and sixth interspaces costate, the last less distinctly raised than the two others.

== Biology ==
The food plant is unknown, but adults have been collected on Eupatorium azureum.
