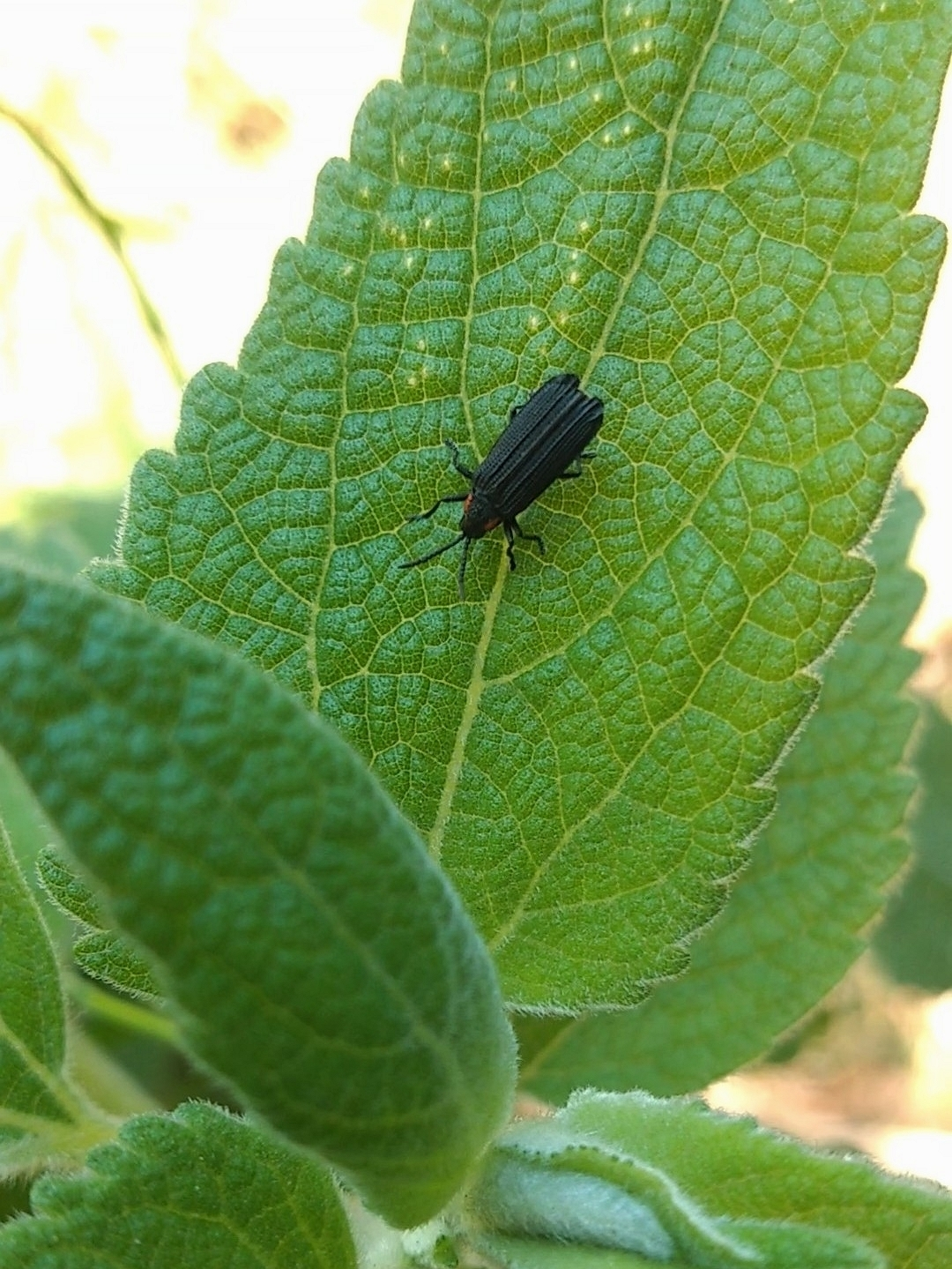

Scientific classification
- Kingdom: Animalia
- Phylum: Arthropoda
- Class: Insecta
- Order: Coleoptera
- Suborder: Polyphaga
- Infraorder: Cucujiformia
- Family: Chrysomelidae
- Genus: Pentispa
- Species: P. bivittaticollis

Binomial name
- Pentispa bivittaticollis (Baly, 1885)

Synonyms
- Chalepus bivittaticollis Baly, 1886; Pentispa larssoni Uhmann, 1957

= Pentispa bivittaticollis =

Species of beetle

Pentispa bivittaticollis is a species of beetle of the family Chrysomelidae. It is found in Mexico.

== Description ==
The front is trisulcate and the antennae are filiform. The thorax is transverse, the sides converging from the base to the apex, more quickly so before their middle. The upper surface is transversely convex, transversely excavated posteriorly, coarsely and strongly punctured. On either side, within the lateral margin, is a broad, callose, impunctate, fulvous vitta. The elytra are parallel, the sides serrulate, rather more coarsely so towards the apex. The apical margin is distinctly dilated, broadly subquadrate-emarginate at the sutural angle. Each elytron has eight, at the extreme base with nine, rows of deeply impressed punctures, the second interspace, together with the suture, costate, the third to the sixth interspaces slightly but distinctly elevated.

== Biology ==
The food plant is unknown.

== Taxonomy ==
Pentispa bivittaticollis was long treated as a synonym of Pentispa morio. In 2023, P. morio was transferred to Xenochalepus and Pentispa bivittaticollis was restored to species status. The species Pentispa larssoni was placed as a new junior synonym of P. bivittaticollis.
