= Pentispa melanura =

Scientific classification
- Kingdom: Animalia
- Phylum: Arthropoda
- Clade: Pancrustacea
- Class: Insecta
- Order: Coleoptera
- Suborder: Polyphaga
- Infraorder: Cucujiformia
- Family: Chrysomelidae
- Genus: Pentispa
- Species: P. melanura

Binomial name
- Pentispa melanura (Chapuis, 1877)

Synonyms
- Uroplata (Pentispa) melanura Chapuis, 1877; Microrhopala dimidiata Horn, 1883

Species of beetle

Pentispa melanura is a species of leaf beetle in the family Chrysomelidae. It is found in Central America and North America, where it has been recorded from the United States (Texas), Belize, Costa Rica, El Salvador, Mexico and Nicaragua.

== Description ==
The vertex is trisulcate and the interocular space is moderately produced. The clypeus is transverse, produced and semilunate. The antennae are black and robust. The thorax is transverse, the sides converging from the base to the apex, distinctly angulate. The upper surface is entirely covered with coarse punctures. The elytra are parallel on the sides, rounded at the apex, finely serrulate (more strongly on the apical margin). Each elytron has eight, at the extreme base with nine, rows of punctures, the second, fourth, and sixth interspaces, together with the suture, costate.

== Biology ==
Although the food plant is unknown, adults have been collected on Viguiera dentata, Verbesina microptera and Verbesina virginica.
