= Pentispa sanguinipennis =

Scientific classification
- Kingdom: Animalia
- Phylum: Arthropoda
- Class: Insecta
- Order: Coleoptera
- Suborder: Polyphaga
- Infraorder: Cucujiformia
- Family: Chrysomelidae
- Genus: Pentispa
- Species: P. sanguinipennis

Binomial name
- Pentispa sanguinipennis (Baly, 1886)

Synonyms
- Uroplata sanguinipennis Baly, 1886

Species of beetle

Pentispa sanguinipennis is a species of beetle of the family Chrysomelidae. It is found in Panama.

== Description ==
The vertex and front are quadrisulcate, with the outer grooves ill defined. The antennae are half the length of the body and very slightly thickened towards the apex, and moderately compressed. The thorax is transverse, the sides angulate and bisinuate. The upper surface is coarsely and deeply punctured, transversely excavated on the hinder disc. The elytra are subparallel, very slightly dilated from the base towards the apex, the latter obtusely rounded, broadly and slightly emarginate at the suture, the lateral margin obsoletely, the apical one strongly and irregularly, serrate. Each elytron has eight rows of deep, transverse punctures, the second, third, fourth, and fifth interspaces elevated, the first and sixth less distinctly thickened.

== Biology ==
The food plant is unknown.
