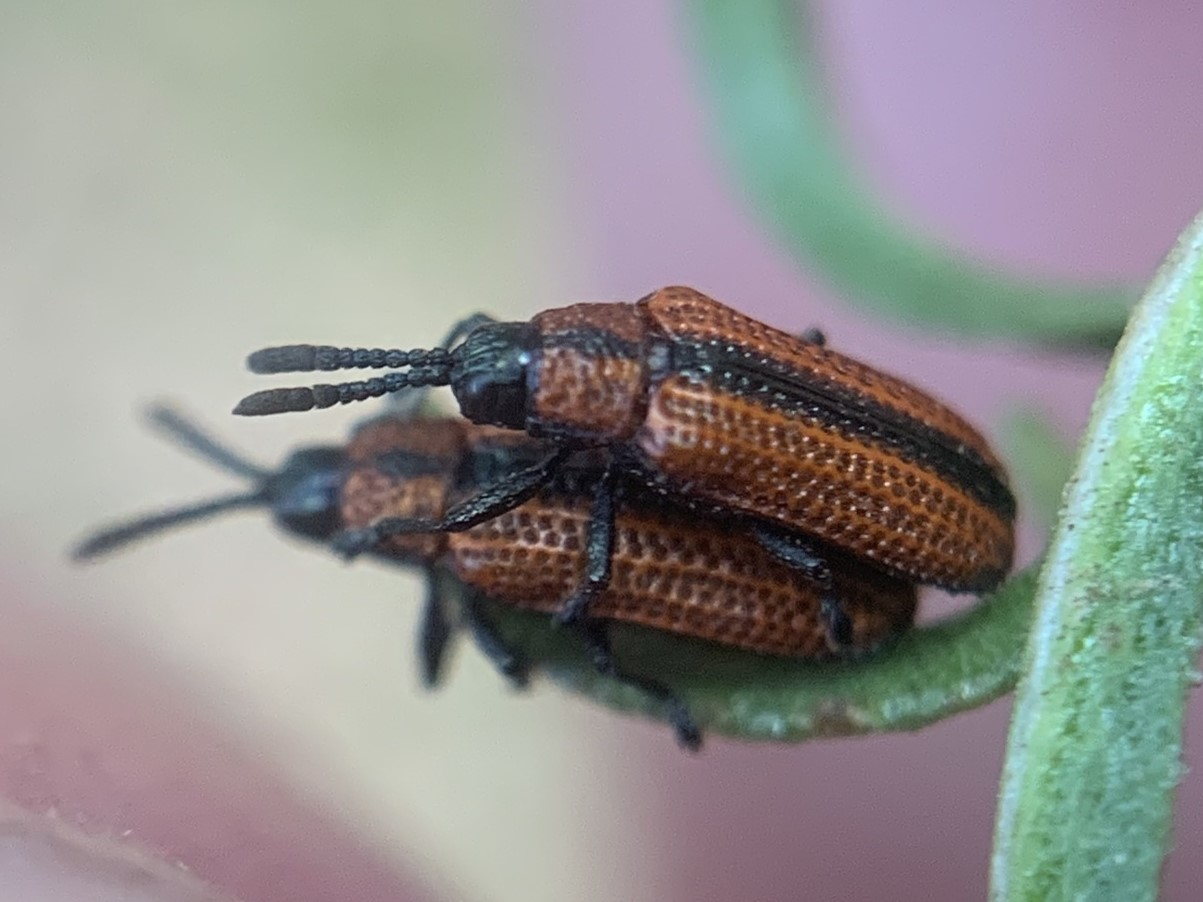

Scientific classification
- Kingdom: Animalia
- Phylum: Arthropoda
- Class: Insecta
- Order: Coleoptera
- Suborder: Polyphaga
- Infraorder: Cucujiformia
- Family: Chrysomelidae
- Genus: Pentispa
- Species: P. suturalis

Binomial name
- Pentispa suturalis (Baly, 1885)

Synonyms
- Chalepus suturalis Baly 1885; Penthispa suturalis vittula Weise 1911; Microrhopala arizonica Schaeffer, 1906

= Pentispa suturalis =

Species of beetle

Pentispa suturalis is a species of leaf beetle in the family Chrysomelidae. It is found in the United States (Arizona), Guatemala and Mexico (Guerrero, Jalisco, Estado de México, Morelos, Veracruz).

== Description ==
The vertex is smooth, the front trisulcate and the interocular space slightly produced. The antennae are nearly half the length of the body, robust and slightly thickened towards the apex. The thorax is transverse, the sides angulate, straight and parallel from the base to the middle, then obliquely converging to the apex, the anterior angle acute. The disc is transversely convex, slightly excavated behind the middle, coarsely rugose-punctate. The elytra are narrowly oblong, with the sides parallel, obtusely rounded at the apex, the lateral margin obsoletely, the apical margin more distinctly, serrulate. Each elytron has eight regular rows of punctures, their alternate interspaces slightly elevated.

== Biology ==
They have been recorded feeding on Baccharis bigelovii and Baccharis salicifolia.
