= Pentispa beata =

Scientific classification
- Kingdom: Animalia
- Phylum: Arthropoda
- Class: Insecta
- Order: Coleoptera
- Suborder: Polyphaga
- Infraorder: Cucujiformia
- Family: Chrysomelidae
- Genus: Pentispa
- Species: P. beata

Binomial name
- Pentispa beata (Baly, 1886)

Synonyms
- Uroplata beata Baly, 1886

Species of beetle

Pentispa beata is a species of beetle of the family Chrysomelidae. It is found in Nicaragua and Mexico (Guerrero, Veracruz).

== Description ==
The head is smooth, the front moderately produced between the eyes, deeply trisulcate. The antennae are robust and equal in length to the head and thorax. The thorax is about one fourth broader than long at the base, with the sides nearly straight, obsoletely bisinuate, obliquely converging from the base to the apex, the anterior angle armed laterally with a short upper surface which is subcylindrical on the sides and at the apex, flattened on the hinder disc, closely and deeply foveolate-punctate. The elytra is narrowly oblong, parallel, obtusely rounded at the apex and rather coarsely serrulate. Each elytron has eight, at the base nine, regular rows of punctures. The second and fourth interspaces rather strongly costate, the sixth less strongly elevated, finely serrulate below its middle.

== Biology ==
The food plant is unknown.
