= Pentispa pratti =

Scientific classification
- Kingdom: Animalia
- Phylum: Arthropoda
- Class: Insecta
- Order: Coleoptera
- Suborder: Polyphaga
- Infraorder: Cucujiformia
- Family: Chrysomelidae
- Genus: Pentispa
- Species: P. pratti

Binomial name
- Pentispa pratti Pic, 1932

Species of beetle

Pentispa pratti is a species of beetle of the family Chrysomelidae. It is found in Colombia.

== Biology ==
The food plant is unknown.
