= Pentispa perroudi =

Scientific classification
- Kingdom: Animalia
- Phylum: Arthropoda
- Class: Insecta
- Order: Coleoptera
- Suborder: Polyphaga
- Infraorder: Cucujiformia
- Family: Chrysomelidae
- Genus: Pentispa
- Species: P. perroudi

Binomial name
- Pentispa perroudi Pic, 1933

Species of beetle

Pentispa perroudi is a species of beetle of the family Chrysomelidae. It is found in Mexico.

== Biology ==
The food plant is unknown.
