= Lycoidispa =

Scientific classification
- Kingdom: Animalia
- Phylum: Arthropoda
- Clade: Pancrustacea
- Class: Insecta
- Order: Coleoptera
- Suborder: Polyphaga
- Infraorder: Cucujiformia
- Family: Chrysomelidae
- Subfamily: Cassidinae
- Tribe: Chalepini
- Genus: Lycoidispa; Ramsey, 2025

Genus of leaf beetles

Lycoidispa is a genus of beetles belonging to the family Chrysomelidae.

== Species ==
- Lycoidispa amplipennis (Uhmann, 1930)
- Lycoidispa corona Ramsey, 2025
- Lycoidispa cristata (Chapuis, 1877)
- Lycoidispa emarginata (Chapuis, 1877)
- Lycoidispa explanata (Chapuis, 1877)
- Lycoidispa gravida Ramsey, 2025
- Lycoidispa lycoides Ramsey, 2025
- Lycoidispa parumpunctata (Weise, 1910)
- Lycoidispa stevedrotti Ramsey, 2025
- Lycoidispa tenebrae Ramsey, 2025
