= Pentispa collaris =

Scientific classification
- Kingdom: Animalia
- Phylum: Arthropoda
- Class: Insecta
- Order: Coleoptera
- Suborder: Polyphaga
- Infraorder: Cucujiformia
- Family: Chrysomelidae
- Genus: Pentispa
- Species: P. collaris

Binomial name
- Pentispa collaris (Thunberg, 1805)

Synonyms
- Chalepus collaris Thunberg, 1805; Penthispa cyanipennis Pic, 1933

Species of beetle

Pentispa collaris is a species of beetle of the family Chrysomelidae. It is found in Jamaica.

== Biology ==
The recorded food plants are Brunchosia species.
