= Pentispa atrocaerulea =

Scientific classification
- Kingdom: Animalia
- Phylum: Arthropoda
- Class: Insecta
- Order: Coleoptera
- Suborder: Polyphaga
- Infraorder: Cucujiformia
- Family: Chrysomelidae
- Genus: Pentispa
- Species: P. atrocaerulea

Binomial name
- Pentispa atrocaerulea (Champion, 1894)

Synonyms
- Chalepus atrocaerulea Champion, 1894

Species of beetle

Pentispa atrocaerulea is a species of beetle of the family Chrysomelidae. It is found in Mexico (Guerrero).

== Biology ==
The food plant is unknown.
