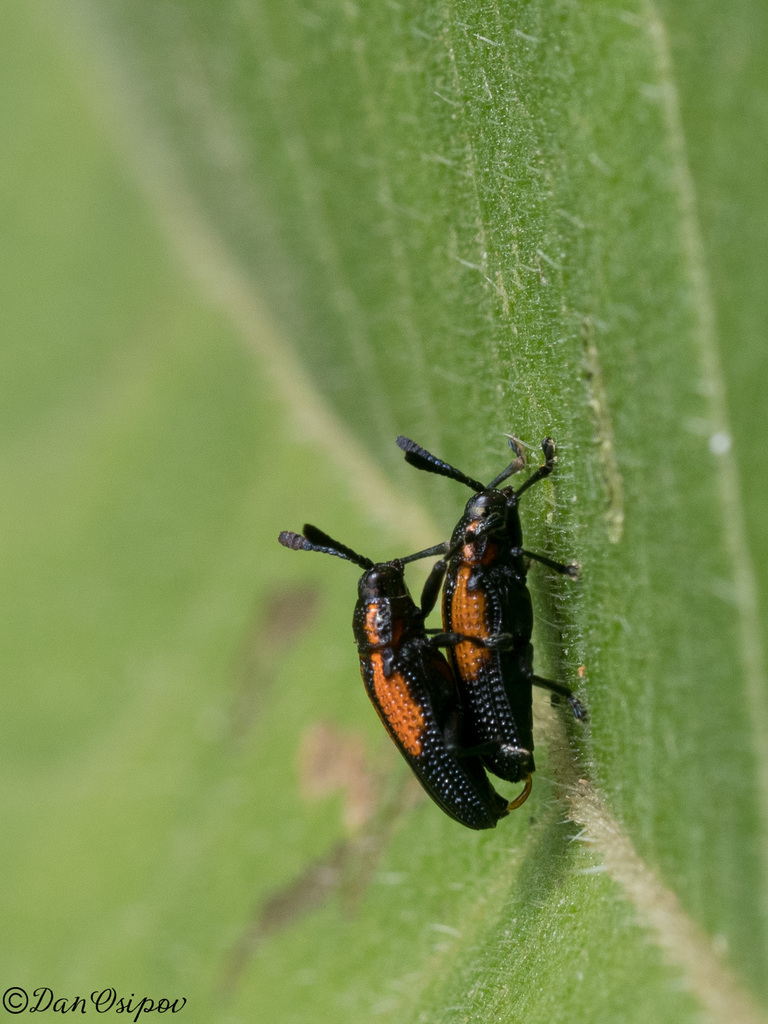

Scientific classification
- Kingdom: Animalia
- Phylum: Arthropoda
- Class: Insecta
- Order: Coleoptera
- Suborder: Polyphaga
- Infraorder: Cucujiformia
- Family: Chrysomelidae
- Genus: Pentispa
- Species: P. aequatoriana

Binomial name
- Pentispa aequatoriana Weise, 1910

= Pentispa aequatoriana =

Species of beetle

Pentispa aequatoriana is a species of beetle of the family Chrysomelidae. It is found in Ecuador.

== Description ==
Adults reach a length of about 4.5–5 mm. Adults are black, the front of the head and middle of the prothorax bronze. There is a yellow sublateral band on the prothorax, as well as a yellow elongated spot, extending from the base to the middle of each elytra.

== Biology ==
The food plant is unknown.
