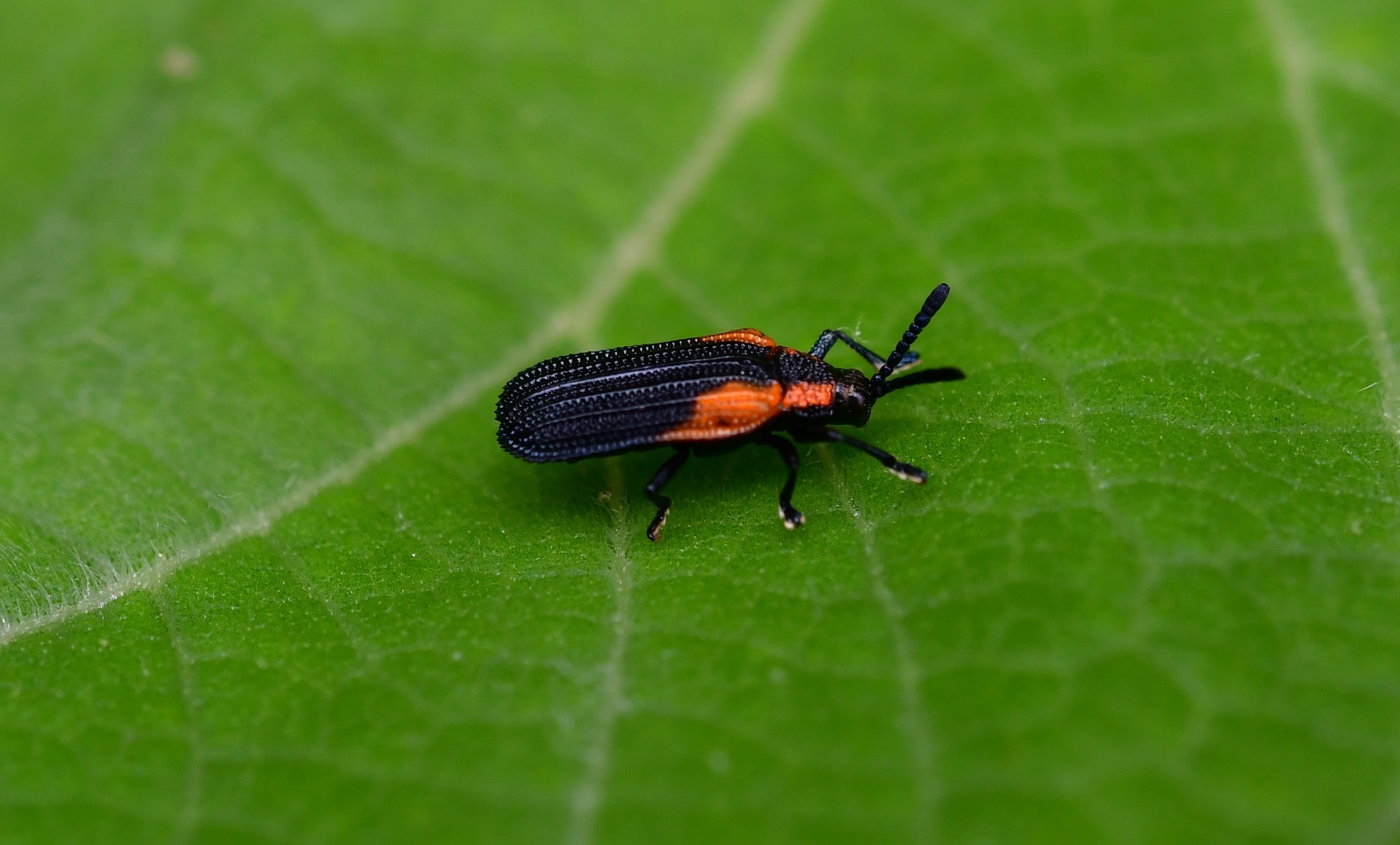

Scientific classification
- Kingdom: Animalia
- Phylum: Arthropoda
- Class: Insecta
- Order: Coleoptera
- Suborder: Polyphaga
- Infraorder: Cucujiformia
- Family: Chrysomelidae
- Genus: Pentispa
- Species: P. chevrolati

Binomial name
- Pentispa chevrolati (Chapuis, 1877)

Synonyms
- Uroplata (Pentispa) chevrolati Chapuis, 1877; Uroplata (Pentispa) fastidiosa Chapuis, 1877

= Pentispa chevrolati =

Species of beetle

Pentispa chevrolati is a species of beetle of the family Chrysomelidae. It is found in Colombia, Costa Rica, Guatemala and Mexico (Veracruz).

== Description ==
The head is tinged with aeneous, the vertex and front impressed with three to five longitudinal grooves. The clypeus is produced, transverse and trigonate. The antennas are rather longer than the head and thorax, slightly thickened towards the apex. The thorax is transverse, the sides converging from the base to the apex, bisinuate. The upper surface is transversely convex, transversely excavated on the hinder disc, closely and strongly punctured. There is a subtorulose vitta on either side, rather less closely punctured than the disc, fulvous. The elytra are broader than the thorax, parallel on the sides, obtusely rounded at the apex. The lateral margin is finely, the apical one rather more distinctly, serrulate. Each elytron has eight, at the extreme base with nine, rows of punctures. The suture, together with the second, fourth, and sixth interspaces, moderately costate.

== Biology ==
The food plant is unknown.
