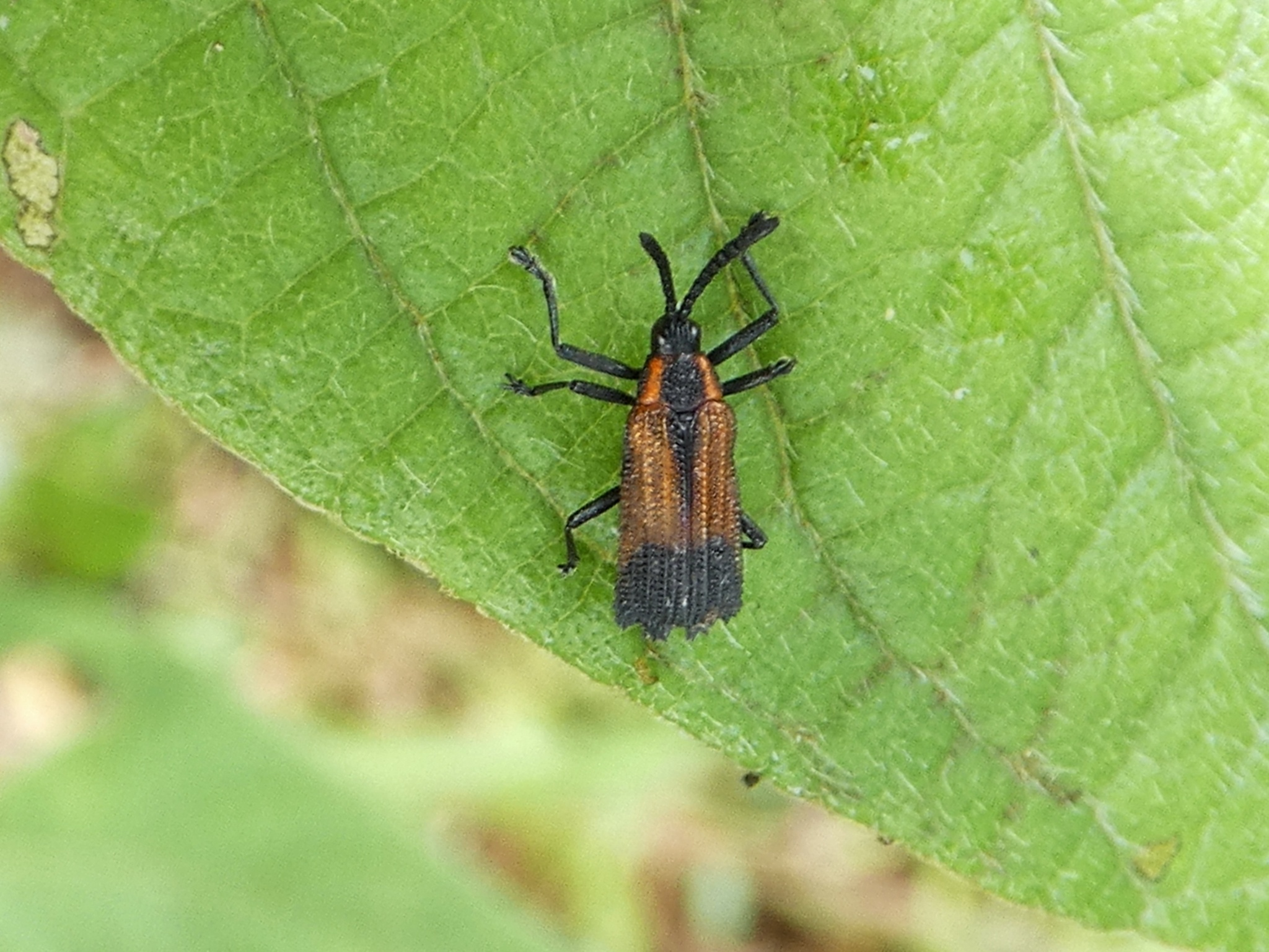

Scientific classification
- Kingdom: Animalia
- Phylum: Arthropoda
- Class: Insecta
- Order: Coleoptera
- Suborder: Polyphaga
- Infraorder: Cucujiformia
- Family: Chrysomelidae
- Genus: Pentispa
- Species: P. clarkella

Binomial name
- Pentispa clarkella (Baly, 1886)

Synonyms
- Uroplata clarkella Baly, 1886

= Pentispa clarkella =

Species of beetle

Pentispa clarkella is a species of beetle of the family Chrysomelidae. It is found in Costa Rica, Guatemala, Nicaragua and Panama.

== Description ==
The head is tinged with aeneous, the vertex and front impressed with four longitudinal grooves and the clypeus transverse, semilunate, its upper edge free, obsoletely angulate. The antennae are half the length of the body, robust and slightly compressed. The thorax is transverse, the side converging from the base to the apex, slightly but distinctly angulate. The upper surface is transversely convex, transversely excavated on the hinder disc, closely and coarsely punctured either side with a broad submarginal torulose, impunctate, fulvous vitta. The elytra are subparallel, obtuse and rounded at the apex. The lateral margin is finely serrulate, the apical one irregularly notched, and subquadrate-emarginate at the sutural angle. Each elytron has eight regular rows of punctures, the second, fourth, and sixth interspaces, together with the suture, costate.

== Biology ==
The recorded food plants are Elephantopus species.
