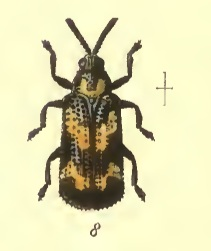

Scientific classification
- Kingdom: Animalia
- Phylum: Arthropoda
- Class: Insecta
- Order: Coleoptera
- Suborder: Polyphaga
- Infraorder: Cucujiformia
- Family: Chrysomelidae
- Genus: Pentispa
- Species: P. sallaei

Binomial name
- Pentispa sallaei (Baly, 1886)

Synonyms
- Uroplata sallaei Baly, 1886; Pentispa rockefelleri Pallister, 1953

= Pentispa sallaei =

Species of beetle

Pentispa sallaei is a species of beetle of the family Chrysomelidae. It is found in Mexico (Durango, Guerrero, Hidalgo, Jalisco, Morelos, Puebla).

== Description ==
The vertex is deeply trisulcate and the interocular space produced. The antennae are scarcely equal to the head and thorax in length, robust. The thorax is transverse, the sides converging from the base to the apex, obsoletely angulate, the exterior angle armed with a very short lateral tooth. The upper surface is transversely convex, transversely flattened on the hinder disc, coarsely, deeply, and irregularly punctured, the fulvous markings nearly impunctate. The scutellum is transverse, truncate, blackish-piceous. The elytra are oblong, parallel, obtusely rounded at the apex, the lateral margin distinctly, the apical one more strongly, serrulate. Each elytron has eight regular rows of large, deeply impressed punctures, the second, fourth, and sixth interspaces subcostate. The suture is rather more strongly elevated.

== Biology ==
The food plant is unknown.
