= Pentispa candezei =

Scientific classification
- Kingdom: Animalia
- Phylum: Arthropoda
- Class: Insecta
- Order: Coleoptera
- Suborder: Polyphaga
- Infraorder: Cucujiformia
- Family: Chrysomelidae
- Genus: Pentispa
- Species: P. candezei

Binomial name
- Pentispa candezei (Chapuis, 1877)

Synonyms
- Uroplata (Pentispa) candezei Chapuis, 1877

Species of beetle

Pentispa candezei is a species of beetle of the family Chrysomelidae. It is found in Guatemala and Mexico (Morelos, Oaxaca, Veracruz).

== Description ==
The neck and vertex are rugose-punctate, the front trisulcate, the medial groove less strongly impressed than the lateral ones. The interocular space is rather strongly produced and the clypeus is produced, transverse, its apex obtuse. The antennae are rather longer than the head and thorax. The thorax is transverse, the sides converging from the base to the apex, obtusely angulate, sinuate from the base to the middle, then bisinuate and more quickly converging to the apex. The upper surface is transversely convex, depressed on the hinder disc, closely and coarsely rugose-punctate. The scutellum is transverse, its apex truncate, slightly bisinuate. The elytra are broader than the thorax, oblong, parallel, regularly rounded at the apex and the sides distinctly and somewhat irregularly, the apical margin more strongly, serrulate. Each elytron has eight, at the extreme base with nine rows of punctures. The suture, together with the second, fourth, and sixth interspaces, strongly costate.

== Biology ==
The food plant is unknown.
