= Lycoidispa amplipennis =

Scientific classification
- Kingdom: Animalia
- Phylum: Arthropoda
- Class: Insecta
- Order: Coleoptera
- Suborder: Polyphaga
- Infraorder: Cucujiformia
- Family: Chrysomelidae
- Genus: Lycoidispa
- Species: L. amplipennis

Binomial name
- Lycoidispa amplipennis (Uhmann, 1930)

Synonyms
- Pentispa amplipennis Uhmann, 1930

Species of beetle

Lycoidispa amplipennis is a species of beetle of the family Chrysomelidae. It is found in Costa Rica.

== Biology ==
The food plant is unknown.
