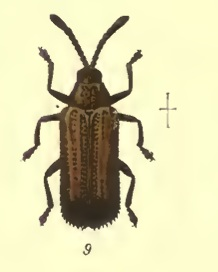

Scientific classification
- Kingdom: Animalia
- Phylum: Arthropoda
- Class: Insecta
- Order: Coleoptera
- Suborder: Polyphaga
- Infraorder: Cucujiformia
- Family: Chrysomelidae
- Genus: Pentispa
- Species: P. vittatipennis

Binomial name
- Pentispa vittatipennis (Baly, 1886)

Synonyms
- Uroplata vittatipennis Baly, 1886

= Pentispa vittatipennis =

Species of beetle

Pentispa vittatipennis is a species of beetle of the family Chrysomelidae. It is found in Costa Rica, Honduras and Nicaragua.

== Description ==
The vertex is deeply trisulcate and the interocular space is rather strongly produced. The clypeus is blackish-piceous, prominent, transverse and subpentangular. The antennae are robust and longer than the head and thorax, scarcely thickened towards the apex. The thorax is transverse, the sides obliquely converging from the base to the apex, distinctly angulate. The upper surface is transversely convex, flattened on the hinder disc, coarsely and strongly punctured. There is a subcallose, nearly impunctate, vitta on either side, obscure fulvous. The scutellum is transverse, its apex truncate. The elytra is oblong, parallel on the sides, rounded at the apex. Each elytron has eight regular rows of punctures, the second, fourth, and sixth interspaces, together with the suture, costate.

== Biology ==
The recorded food plants are Asteraceae species.
