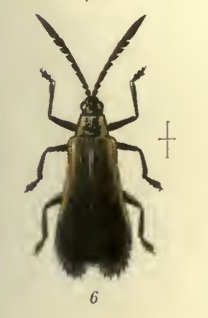

Scientific classification
- Kingdom: Animalia
- Phylum: Arthropoda
- Class: Insecta
- Order: Coleoptera
- Suborder: Polyphaga
- Infraorder: Cucujiformia
- Family: Chrysomelidae
- Genus: Lycoidispa
- Species: L. explanata

Binomial name
- Lycoidispa explanata (Chapuis, 1877)

Synonyms
- Odontota explanata Chapuis, 1877; Pentispa explanata

= Lycoidispa explanata =

Species of beetle

Lycoidispa explanata is a species of beetle of the family Chrysomelidae. It is found in Colombia, Costa Rica, Guatemala, Mexico (Oaxaca, Tamaulipas, Veracruz), Nicaragua, Panama, Trinidad and Venezuela.

== Description ==
The head has an aeneous tinge. The vertex is trisulcate and the lateral grooves are deeply impressed, the apex of the clypeus produced into a transverse bifid plate. The antennae are rather more than half the length of the body. The thorax is transverse, subconic, the sides converging from the base to the apex, slightly bisinuate. It is transversely convex, flattened and excavated on the hinder disc, coarsely punctured. There is a broad fulvous bicallose impunctate vitta on either side. The elytra are gradually increasing in width towards the apex, the sides finely serrulate, the apical margin dilated, more strongly serrate, broadly subquadrate emarginate at the sutural angle. Each elytron has eight regular rows of punctures, the second interspace strongly costate.

== Biology ==
The recorded food plants are Pithecoctenium species.
