= Lycoidispa cristata =

Scientific classification
- Kingdom: Animalia
- Phylum: Arthropoda
- Class: Insecta
- Order: Coleoptera
- Suborder: Polyphaga
- Infraorder: Cucujiformia
- Family: Chrysomelidae
- Genus: Lycoidispa
- Species: L. cristata

Binomial name
- Lycoidispa cristata (Chapuis, 1877)

Synonyms
- Uroplata (Pentispa) cristata Chapuis, 1877; Pentispa cristata

Species of beetle

Lycoidispa cristata is a species of beetle of the family Chrysomelidae. It is found on the Antilles.

== Biology ==
The food plant is unknown.
