= Lycoidispa parumpunctata =

Scientific classification
- Kingdom: Animalia
- Phylum: Arthropoda
- Class: Insecta
- Order: Coleoptera
- Suborder: Polyphaga
- Infraorder: Cucujiformia
- Family: Chrysomelidae
- Genus: Lycoidispa
- Species: L. parumpunctata

Binomial name
- Lycoidispa parumpunctata Weise, 1910

Synonyms
- Pentispa parumpunctata Weise, 1910

Species of beetle

Lycoidispa parumpunctata is a species of beetle of the family Chrysomelidae. It is found in Mexico.

== Description ==
Adults reach a length of about 7 mm. Adults are black, while the pro- and mesosternum are buff and the prothorax and elytra are buff anteriorly. There are three narrow black bands.

== Biology ==
The food plant is unknown.
