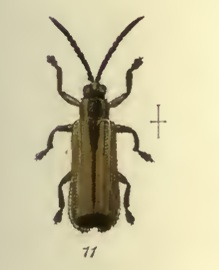

Scientific classification
- Kingdom: Animalia
- Phylum: Arthropoda
- Class: Insecta
- Order: Coleoptera
- Suborder: Polyphaga
- Infraorder: Cucujiformia
- Family: Chrysomelidae
- Genus: Lycoidispa
- Species: L. emarginata

Binomial name
- Lycoidispa emarginata (Chapuis, 1877)

Synonyms
- Uroplata (Pentispa) emarginata Chapuis, 1877; Pentispa emarginata

= Lycoidispa emarginata =

Species of beetle

Lycoidispa emarginata is a species of beetle of the family Chrysomelidae. It is found in Colombia.

== Biology ==
The food plant is unknown.
