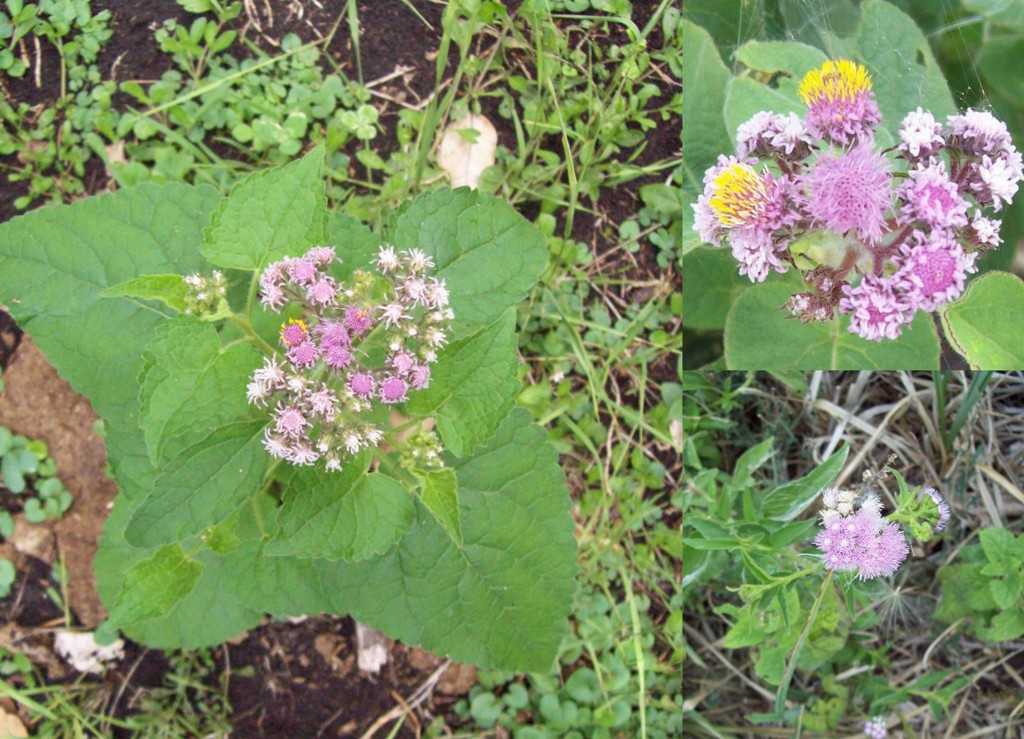

Scientific classification
- Kingdom: Plantae
- Clade: Tracheophytes
- Clade: Angiosperms
- Clade: Eudicots
- Clade: Asterids
- Order: Asterales
- Family: Asteraceae
- Subfamily: Asteroideae
- Tribe: Eupatorieae
- Genus: Urolepis (DC.) R.M.King & H.Rob.
- Species: U. hecatantha

Binomial name
- Urolepis hecatantha (DC.) R.M.King & H.Rob.

Synonyms
- Eupatorium sect. Urolepis (DC.) Benth.; Hebeclinium sect. Urolepis DC.; Hebeclinium hecatanthum DC. (type species); Hebeclinium urolepis DC.; Eupatorium urolepis Daveau; Eupatorium populifolium Hook. & Arn.; Eupatorium appendiculatum Less. ex Baker

= Urolepis hecatantha =

Species of flowering plant

Urolepis is a genus of South American plants in the tribe Eupatorieae within the family Asteraceae.

== Species ==
The only known species is Urolepis hecatantha, native to Paraguay, Uruguay, Bolivia, northern Argentina (Provinces of Salta, Jujuy, Chaco, Entre Ríos, Misiones, Corrientes, Buenos Aires, Tucumán), and southern Brazil (States of Paraná, Rio Grande do Sul, Santa Catarina, Minas Gerais, Rio de Janeiro, São Paulo).
