= List of Charidotella species =

This is a list of 100 species in Charidotella, a genus of tortoise beetles in the family Chrysomelidae.

== Charidotella species ==
- Charidotella actiosa (Spaeth, 1926)^{i c g}
- Charidotella ambita (Champion, 1894)^{i c g}
- Charidotella amicula (Spaeth, 1936)^{i c g}
- Charidotella amoena (Boheman, 1855)^{i c g}
- Charidotella amoenula (Boheman, 1855)^{i c g}
- Charidotella annexa (Boheman, 1855)^{i c g}
- Charidotella atalanta (Boheman, 1862)^{i c g}
- Charidotella atromarginata Borowiec, 2009^{i c g}
- Charidotella bifasciata (Linnaeus, 1758)^{i c g}
- Charidotella bifossulata (Boheman, 1855)^{i c g b}
- Charidotella bifoveata (Spaeth, 1926)^{i c g}
- Charidotella bisbinotata (Boheman, 1855)^{i c g}
- Charidotella bistillata (Spaeth, 1936)^{i c g}
- Charidotella bivulnerata (Boheman, 1855)^{i c g}
- Charidotella bordoni Borowiec, 2002^{i c g}
- Charidotella carnulenta (Erichson, 1847)^{i c g}
- Charidotella chanchamayana (Spaeth, 1926)^{i c g}
- Charidotella cingulata (Boheman, 1862)^{i c}
- Charidotella circumnotata (Boheman, 1862)^{i c g}
- Charidotella conclusa (Boheman, 1855)^{i c g}
- Charidotella connectens (Boheman, 1855)^{i c g}
- Charidotella cyclographa (Boheman, 1855)^{i c g}
- Charidotella discoidalis (Boheman, 1855)^{i c g}
- Charidotella dominicanensis Borowiec, 2011^{i c g}
- Charidotella duplex (Champion, 1894)^{i c g}
- Charidotella ecuadorica Borowiec, 1989^{i c g}
- Charidotella egregia (Boheman, 1855)^{i c g}
- Charidotella emarginata (Boheman, 1855)^{i c g b}
- Charidotella ferranti (Spaeth, 1926)^{i c}
- Charidotella flaviae de Andrade Maia and Buzzi, 2005^{i c g}
- Charidotella fumosa (Boheman, 1855)^{i c g}
- Charidotella glaucina (Boheman, 1855)^{i c g}
- Charidotella glaucovittata (Erichson, 1847)^{i c g}
- Charidotella goyazensis (Spaeth, 1936)^{i c g}
- Charidotella granaria (Boheman, 1855)^{i c g}
- Charidotella guadeloupensis (Boheman, 1855)^{i c g}
- Charidotella hoegbergi (Boheman, 1855)^{i c g}
- Charidotella immaculata (Olivier, 1790)^{i c g}
- Charidotella incerta (Boheman, 1855)^{i c g}
- Charidotella inconstans (Boheman, 1855)^{i c g}
- Charidotella incorrupta (Boheman, 1855)^{i c g}
- Charidotella inculta (Boheman, 1855)^{i c g}
- Charidotella irazuensis (Champion, 1894)^{i c g}
- Charidotella jamaicensis (Blake, 1966)^{i c g}
- Charidotella kesseli Borowiec, 1989^{i c g}
- Charidotella latevittata (Boheman, 1855)^{i c g}
- Charidotella limpida (Boheman, 1855)^{i c g}
- Charidotella linigera (Boheman, 1862)^{i c g}
- Charidotella liquida (Erichson, 1847)^{i c g}
- Charidotella marcidula (Boheman, 1862)^{i c g}
- Charidotella marculenta (Boheman, 1855)^{i c g}
- Charidotella marginepunctata Borowiec, 2004^{i c g}
- Charidotella moraguesi Borowiec, 2007^{i c g}
- Charidotella morio (Fabricius, 1801)^{i c}
- Charidotella myops (Boheman, 1855)^{i c g}
- Charidotella nigriceps (Spaeth, 1936)^{i c}
- Charidotella nigripennis Borowiec, 2009^{i c g}
- Charidotella oblectabilis (Spaeth, 1926)^{i c g}
- Charidotella oblita (Suffrian, 1868)^{i c g}
- Charidotella obnubilata (Weise, 1921)^{i c g}
- Charidotella opulenta (Boheman, 1855)^{i c g}
- Charidotella ormondensis (Blatchley, 1920)^{i c g}
- Charidotella pacata Borowiec, 2007^{i c g}
- Charidotella pallescens (Boheman, 1855)^{i c g}
- Charidotella pectoralis (Kirsch, 1883)^{i c g}
- Charidotella pellucida (Boheman, 1855)^{i c g}
- Charidotella peruviana (Spaeth, 1942)^{i c}
- Charidotella polita (Klug, 1829)^{i c g}
- Charidotella posticata (Boheman, 1855)^{i c g}
- Charidotella praeusta (Boheman, 1855)^{i c g}
- Charidotella proxima (Boheman, 1855)^{i c g}
- Charidotella pudica (Boheman, 1855)^{i c g}
- Charidotella puella (Boheman, 1855)^{i c g}
- Charidotella purpurata (Boheman, 1855)^{i c g b}
- Charidotella purpurea (Linnaeus, 1758)^{i c g}
- Charidotella quadrisignata (Boheman, 1855)^{i c g}
- Charidotella rasilis (Spaeth, 1926)^{i c g}
- Charidotella recidiva (Spaeth, 1926)^{i c g}
- Charidotella rubicunda (Guérin-Méneville, 1844)^{i c g}
- Charidotella santaremi Borowiec, 1995^{i c g}
- Charidotella semiatrata (Boheman, 1862)^{i c g}
- Charidotella seriatopunctata (Spaeth, 1901)^{i c g}
- Charidotella sexpunctata (Fabricius, 1781)^{i c g b} (golden tortoise beetle)
- Charidotella sinuata (Fabricius, 1781)^{i c g}
- Charidotella steinhauseni Borowiec, 1989^{i c g}
- Charidotella striatopunctata (Boheman, 1855)^{i c g}
- Charidotella stulta (Boheman, 1855)^{i c g}
- Charidotella subannulata (Boheman, 1862)^{i c g}
- Charidotella submaculata (Boheman, 1855)^{i c g}
- Charidotella subnotata (Boheman, 1855)^{i c g}
- Charidotella subsignata (Boheman, 1862)^{i c g}
- Charidotella succinea (Boheman, 1855)^{i c g b}
- Charidotella tricolorata (Champion, 1894)^{i c g}
- Charidotella tuberculata (Fabricius, 1775)^{i c g}
- Charidotella tumida (Champion, 1894)^{i c g}
- Charidotella ventricosa (Boheman, 1855)^{i c g}
- Charidotella vinula (Boheman, 1855)^{i c g}
- Charidotella virgo (Boheman, 1855)^{i c g}
- Charidotella virgulata (Boheman, 1855)^{i c g}
- Charidotella zona (Fabricius, 1801)^{i c g}

Data sources: i = ITIS, c = Catalogue of Life, g = GBIF, b = Bugguide.net
