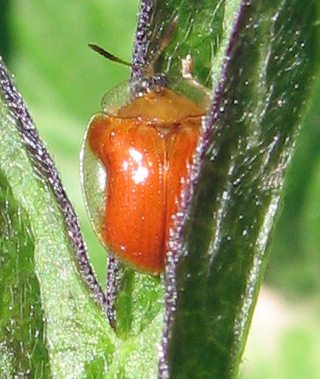

Scientific classification
- Kingdom: Animalia
- Phylum: Arthropoda
- Class: Insecta
- Order: Coleoptera
- Suborder: Polyphaga
- Infraorder: Cucujiformia
- Family: Chrysomelidae
- Genus: Charidotella
- Species: C. purpurata

Binomial name
- Charidotella purpurata (Boheman, 1855)

= Charidotella purpurata =

Species of beetle

Charidotella purpurata is a species of tortoise beetle in the family Chrysomelidae. It is found in North America.
