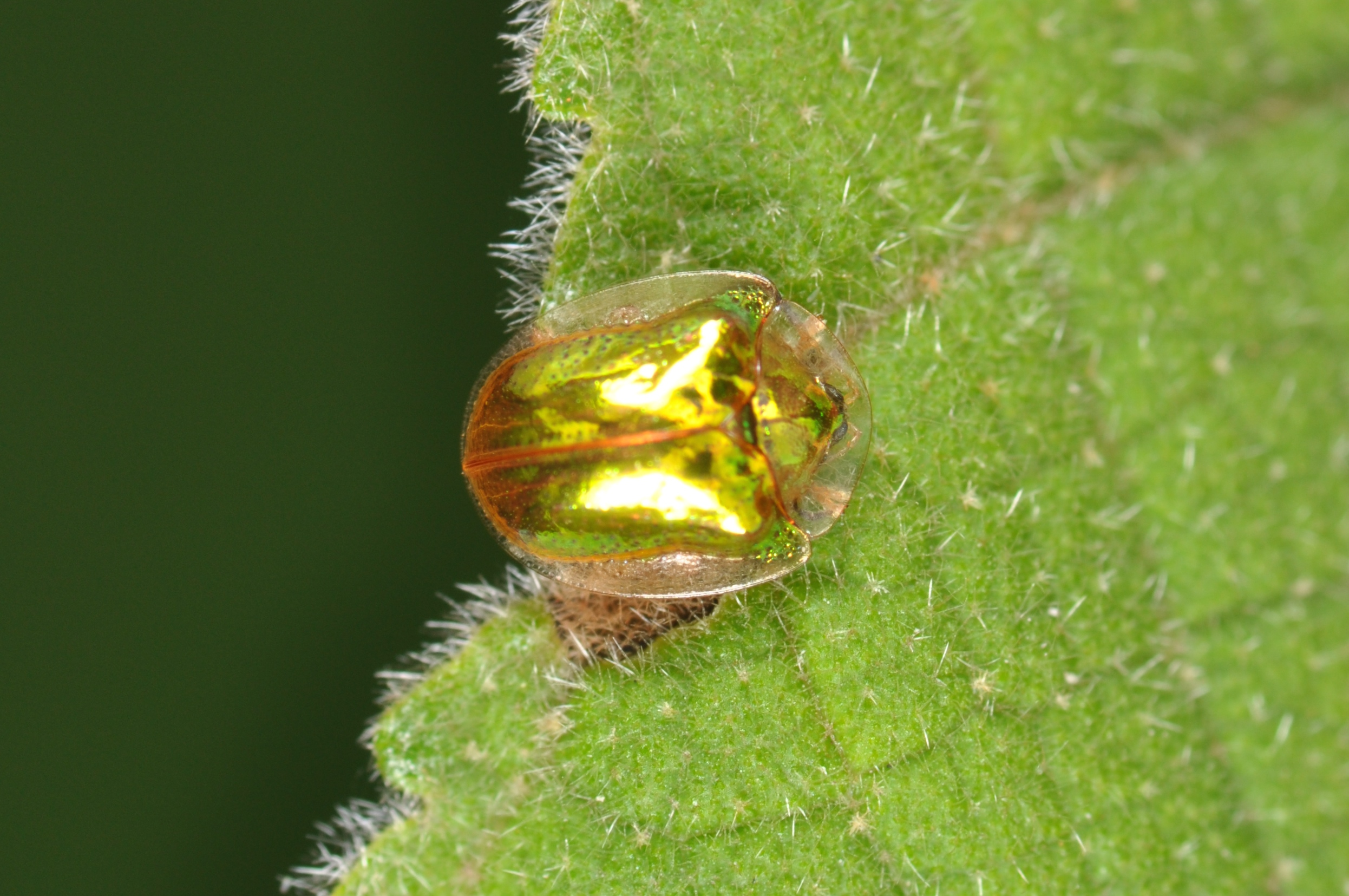

Scientific classification
- Kingdom: Animalia
- Phylum: Arthropoda
- Class: Insecta
- Order: Coleoptera
- Suborder: Polyphaga
- Infraorder: Cucujiformia
- Family: Chrysomelidae
- Genus: Charidotella
- Species: C. ambita

Binomial name
- Charidotella ambita (Champion, 1894)

= Charidotella ambita =

Species of beetle

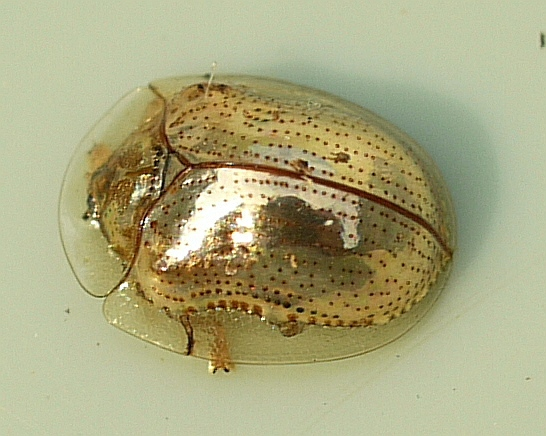
Anatomy of Charidotella ambita

Charidotella ambita is a species of beetle in the genus Charidotella.
