= Charidotella santaremi =

Scientific classification
- Kingdom: Animalia
- Phylum: Arthropoda
- Clade: Pancrustacea
- Class: Insecta
- Order: Coleoptera
- Suborder: Polyphaga
- Infraorder: Cucujiformia
- Family: Chrysomelidae
- Genus: Charidotella
- Species: C. santaremi

Binomial name
- Charidotella santaremi Borowiec, 1995

Species of beetle

Charidotella santaremi is a species of beetle of the family Chrysomelidae. It is found in Brazil (Pará, Pernambuco).
