= Charidotella submaculata =

Scientific classification
- Kingdom: Animalia
- Phylum: Arthropoda
- Clade: Pancrustacea
- Class: Insecta
- Order: Coleoptera
- Suborder: Polyphaga
- Infraorder: Cucujiformia
- Family: Chrysomelidae
- Genus: Charidotella
- Species: C. submaculata

Binomial name
- Charidotella submaculata (Boheman, 1855)

Synonyms
- Coptocycla submaculata Boheman, 1855

Species of beetle

Charidotella submaculata is a species of beetle of the family Chrysomelidae. It is found in Brazil (Pernambuco) and Suriname.
