= Charidotella emarginata =

Scientific classification
- Kingdom: Animalia
- Phylum: Arthropoda
- Class: Insecta
- Order: Coleoptera
- Suborder: Polyphaga
- Infraorder: Cucujiformia
- Family: Chrysomelidae
- Genus: Charidotella
- Species: C. emarginata

Binomial name
- Charidotella emarginata (Boheman, 1855)

Species of beetle

Charidotella emarginata is a species of tortoise beetle in the family Chrysomelidae. It is found in Central America and North America.
