= Charidotella egregia =

Scientific classification
- Kingdom: Animalia
- Phylum: Arthropoda
- Clade: Pancrustacea
- Class: Insecta
- Order: Coleoptera
- Suborder: Polyphaga
- Infraorder: Cucujiformia
- Family: Chrysomelidae
- Genus: Charidotella
- Species: C. egregia

Binomial name
- Charidotella egregia (Boheman, 1855)

Species of beetle

Charidotella egregia is a species of leaf beetle described by Carl Henrik Boheman in 1855. Along with Charidotella sexpunctata, it is known as a golden tortoise beetle.

C. egregia is able to modify its colour in response to stressful events; normally a golden color, it changes to red with black spots in response to threats, likely a defense against predation.

== Coloration and colour switching ==
Charidotella egregia is normally a brilliant metallic gold colour, but is capable of rapidly and reversibly switching to a dull red with black spots when disturbed or stressed — one of the few known examples of active, reversible colour change in insects. The gold state is thought to function as camouflage by mimicking water droplets or reflective plant surfaces, while the red-with-black-spots state is believed to be aposematic, warning potential predators by resembling distasteful or toxic species, such as ladybird beetles.

Both colour states have a structural rather than purely pigmentary basis. Research by Vigneron, Welch, Lousse, Gosselin, Hautier, Colomer and Deparis established the physical mechanism underlying the colour switch: the elytra contain a multilayered optical structure — a thin-film reflector — sandwiched between an outer transparent cuticle layer and an inner pigmented layer. In the relaxed (gold) state, a fluid fills the space between the layers, creating the refractive index contrast needed for strong broadband reflectance across the visible spectrum, producing the metallic golden appearance. When the beetle is disturbed, this fluid is withdrawn, collapsing the reflective structure and allowing the underlying red and black pigments to become visible instead. This hydration-driven optical switching mechanism has attracted interest as a model for the design of bioinspired switchable reflective materials.
