= Charidotella vinula =

Scientific classification
- Kingdom: Animalia
- Phylum: Arthropoda
- Clade: Pancrustacea
- Class: Insecta
- Order: Coleoptera
- Suborder: Polyphaga
- Infraorder: Cucujiformia
- Family: Chrysomelidae
- Genus: Charidotella
- Species: C. vinula

Binomial name
- Charidotella vinula (Boheman, 1855)

Synonyms
- Coptocycla vinula Boheman, 1855; Metriona argentina Frers, 1922

Species of beetle

Charidotella vinula is a species of beetle of the family Chrysomelidae. It is found in Argentina, Bolivia, Brazil (Pará, Pernambuco, Rio Grande do Sul, Santa Catarina), Colombia, Ecuador, French Guiana, Guyana, Mexico, Paraguay, Suriname and Venezuela.
