= Charidotella zona =

Scientific classification
- Kingdom: Animalia
- Phylum: Arthropoda
- Clade: Pancrustacea
- Class: Insecta
- Order: Coleoptera
- Suborder: Polyphaga
- Infraorder: Cucujiformia
- Family: Chrysomelidae
- Genus: Charidotella
- Species: C. zona

Binomial name
- Charidotella zona (Fabricius, 1801)

Synonyms
- Cassida zona Fabricius, 1801; Cassida annulus Olivier, 1790 (not Fabricius, 1781); Cassida flavescens Latreille, 1811; Cassida livida Herbst, 1799

Species of beetle

Charidotella zona is a species of beetle of the family Chrysomelidae. It is found in Bolivia, Brazil (Amazonas, Maranhão, Mato Grosso, Pará, Pernambuco, Rio de Janeiro), Costa Rica, Ecuador, French Guiana, Guyana, Nicaragua, Panama, Peru, Surinam, Trinidad and Tobago and Venezuela.

== Life history ==
The recorded host plants are Ipomoea pes-caprae, Ipomoea phillomega and Merremia umbellata.
