= Charidotella bifossulata =

Scientific classification
- Kingdom: Animalia
- Phylum: Arthropoda
- Class: Insecta
- Order: Coleoptera
- Suborder: Polyphaga
- Infraorder: Cucujiformia
- Family: Chrysomelidae
- Genus: Charidotella
- Species: C. bifossulata

Binomial name
- Charidotella bifossulata (Boheman, 1855)

Species of beetle

Charidotella bifossulata is a species of tortoise beetle in the family Chrysomelidae. It is found in Central America and North America.
