= Charidotella bifasciata =

Scientific classification
- Kingdom: Animalia
- Phylum: Arthropoda
- Clade: Pancrustacea
- Class: Insecta
- Order: Coleoptera
- Suborder: Polyphaga
- Infraorder: Cucujiformia
- Family: Chrysomelidae
- Genus: Charidotella
- Species: C. bifasciata

Binomial name
- Charidotella bifasciata (Linnaeus, 1758)

Synonyms
- Cassida bifasciata Linnaeus, 1758; Cassida obliterata Herbst, 1799; Cassida nigro-maculata De Geer, 1775

Species of beetle

Charidotella bifasciata is a species of beetle of the family Chrysomelidae. It is found in Bolivia, Brazil (Amazonas, Bahia, Mato Grosso, Pará, Pernambuco), Colombia, Ecuador, French Guiana, Paraguay, Peru, Suriname and Trinidad.

== Life history ==
The recorded host plants are Ipomoea pes-caprae.
