= Charidotella immaculata =

Scientific classification
- Kingdom: Animalia
- Phylum: Arthropoda
- Clade: Pancrustacea
- Class: Insecta
- Order: Coleoptera
- Suborder: Polyphaga
- Infraorder: Cucujiformia
- Family: Chrysomelidae
- Genus: Charidotella
- Species: C. immaculata

Binomial name
- Charidotella immaculata (Olivier, 1790)

Synonyms
- Cassida immaculata Olivier, 1790; Coptocycla sejuncta Boheman, 1855

Species of beetle

Charidotella immaculata is a species of beetle of the family Chrysomelidae. It is found in Argentina, Bolivia, Brazil (Goiás, Mato Grosso, Minas Gerais, Pará, Paraná, Pernambuco, Rio de Janeiro, Rio Grande do Sul, Roraima, Santa Catarina, São Paulo), Colombia, Dominica, Ecuador, French Guiana, Paraguay, Peru, Surinam, Trinidad and Tobago and Venezuela.

== Life history ==
The recorded host plants are Ipomoea batatas.
