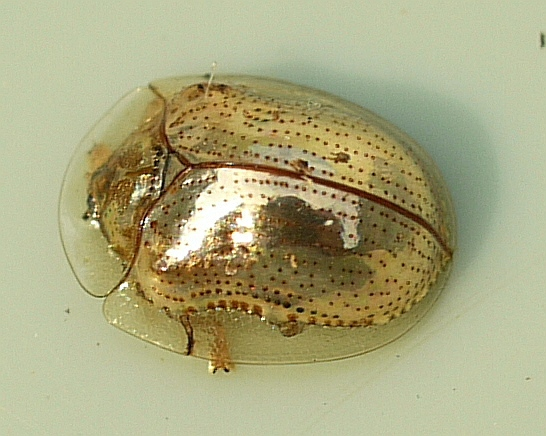

Scientific classification
- Kingdom: Animalia
- Phylum: Arthropoda
- Clade: Pancrustacea
- Class: Insecta
- Order: Coleoptera
- Suborder: Polyphaga
- Infraorder: Cucujiformia
- Family: Chrysomelidae
- Genus: Charidotella
- Species: C. sexpunctata

Binomial name
- Charidotella sexpunctata (Fabricius, 1781)

Synonyms
- Cassida 6 punctata Fabricius, 1781; Cassida bistripustulata Herbst, 1799; Cassida marylandica Herbst, 1799; Cassida pallida Herbst, 1799; Cassida aurichalcea Fabricius, 1855; Cassida aurisplendens Mannerheim, 1843; Coptocycla ternata Boheman, 1855; Coptocycla biimpressa Boheman, 1855; Coptocycla immerita Boheman, 1855; Charidotis sexpustulata Donckier, 1884; Metriona bicolor floridana Schaeffer, 1925; Cassida bicolor Fabricius, 1798; Metriona bicolor; Coptocycla trisignuta Boheman, 1855; Metriona trisignata

= Charidotella sexpunctata =

Species of beetle

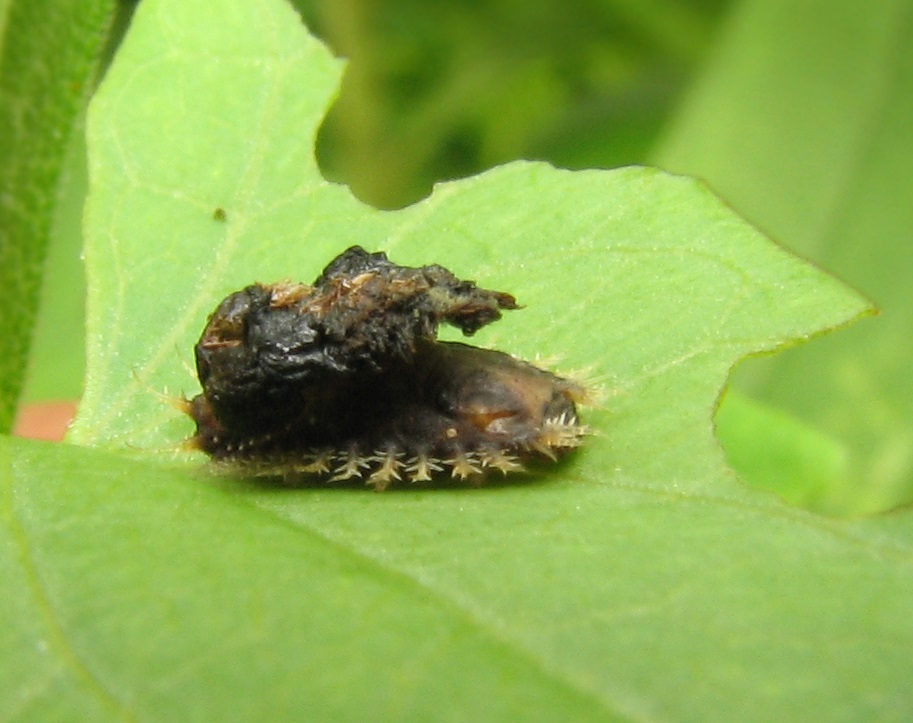
Larva

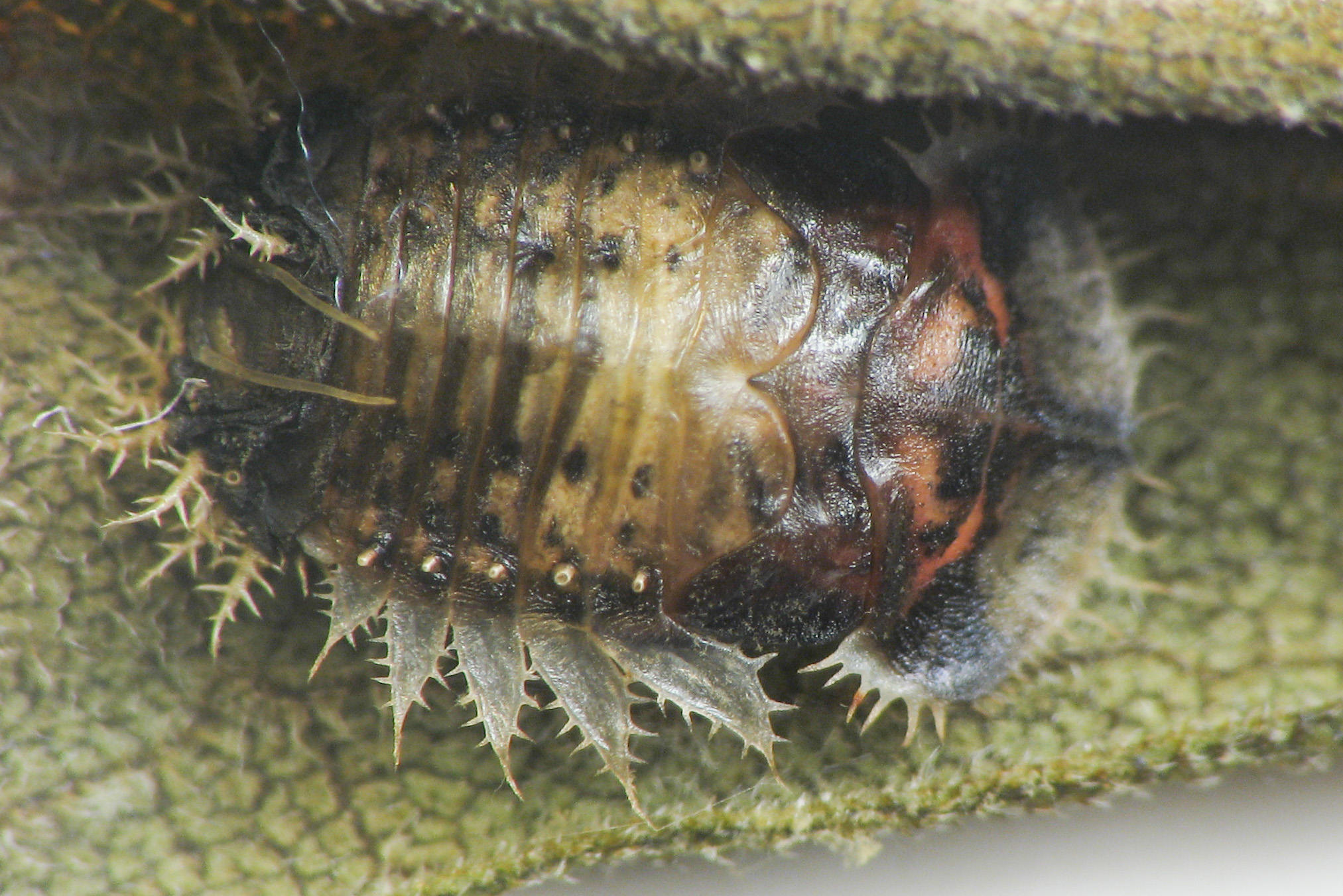
Pupa

Charidotella sexpunctata, the golden tortoise beetle, is a species of beetle in the leaf beetle family, Chrysomelidae. It is native to the Americas, and very broadly distributed. Charidotella sexpunctata in North America was formerly known as Metriona bicolor. The species has also been seen in regions reaching up to Argentina.

== Taxonomy ==
There are two subspecies, ssp. bicolor and ssp. sexpunctata.

== Description ==
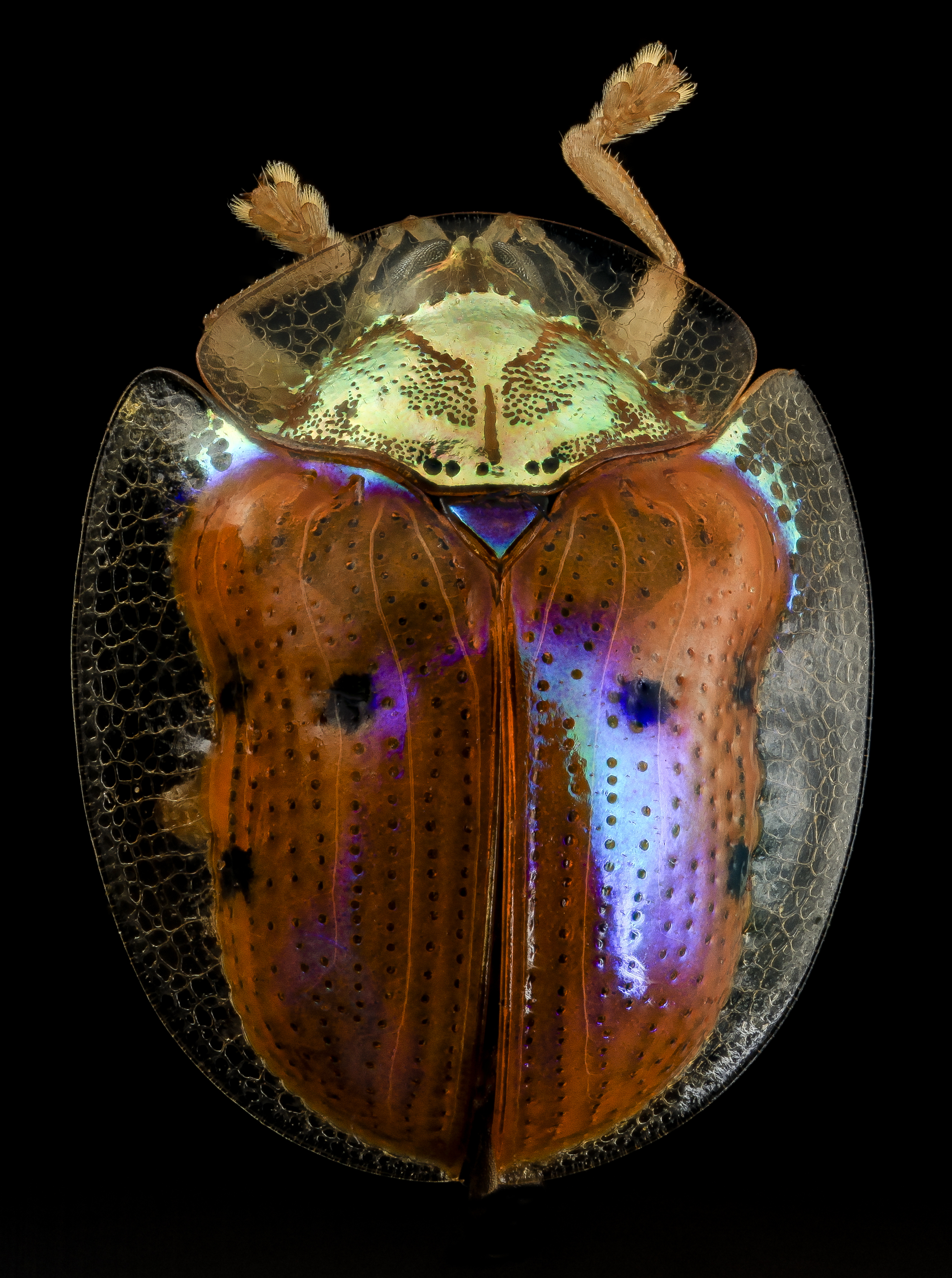
When disturbed, C. sexpunctata turns red with black spots, likely to warn off predators.

Adult C. sexpunctata measure 5–7 millimetres (0.2–0.3 in) in length. They are variable in color from reddish-brown with black spots to brilliant, mirror-like gold, earning it the nickname "goldbug". Elytral margins are expanded and nearly transparent.

The color changes through its development, during mating, and during times of disturbance, such as when it is touched by a human researcher. Scientists have not examined the color-change mechanism in this species. However, color change in the related Panamanian Charidotella egregia (also called 'golden tortoise beetle') occurs when this beetle's elytra hydrate and dehydrate. Adults of both species can turn from shiny gold through reddish-brown when disturbed.

== Life cycle ==
Female Charidotella sexpunctata lay clusters of eggs on stems and on the undersides of host leaves. A spiny, yellowish or reddish brown larva emerges from its egg in 5 through 10 days. A larva accumulates its shed skins and frass on a structure called an anal fork, which it positions over its body as a fecal shield, evidently hiding the larva from predators. This is usually effective against smaller insect predators such as ants, but not larger ones, such as hemipterans. After two to three weeks, a larval Charidotella sexpunctata becomes a spiny brown frass-covered pupa, and in one to two weeks later it emerges as an adult.

== Behaviour and diet ==
This beetle consumes foliage of plants in the family Convolvulaceae, including bindweeds, morning glory and sweet potato. Both adults and larvae feed on foliage.

=== Parasitoids ===
Parasitoids of this species include the eulophid wasp Tetrastichus cassidus and the tachinid fly Eucelatoriopsis dimmocki. Other predators, especially of the larvae, include ladybird beetles, damsel bugs, shield bugs and assassin bugs.
