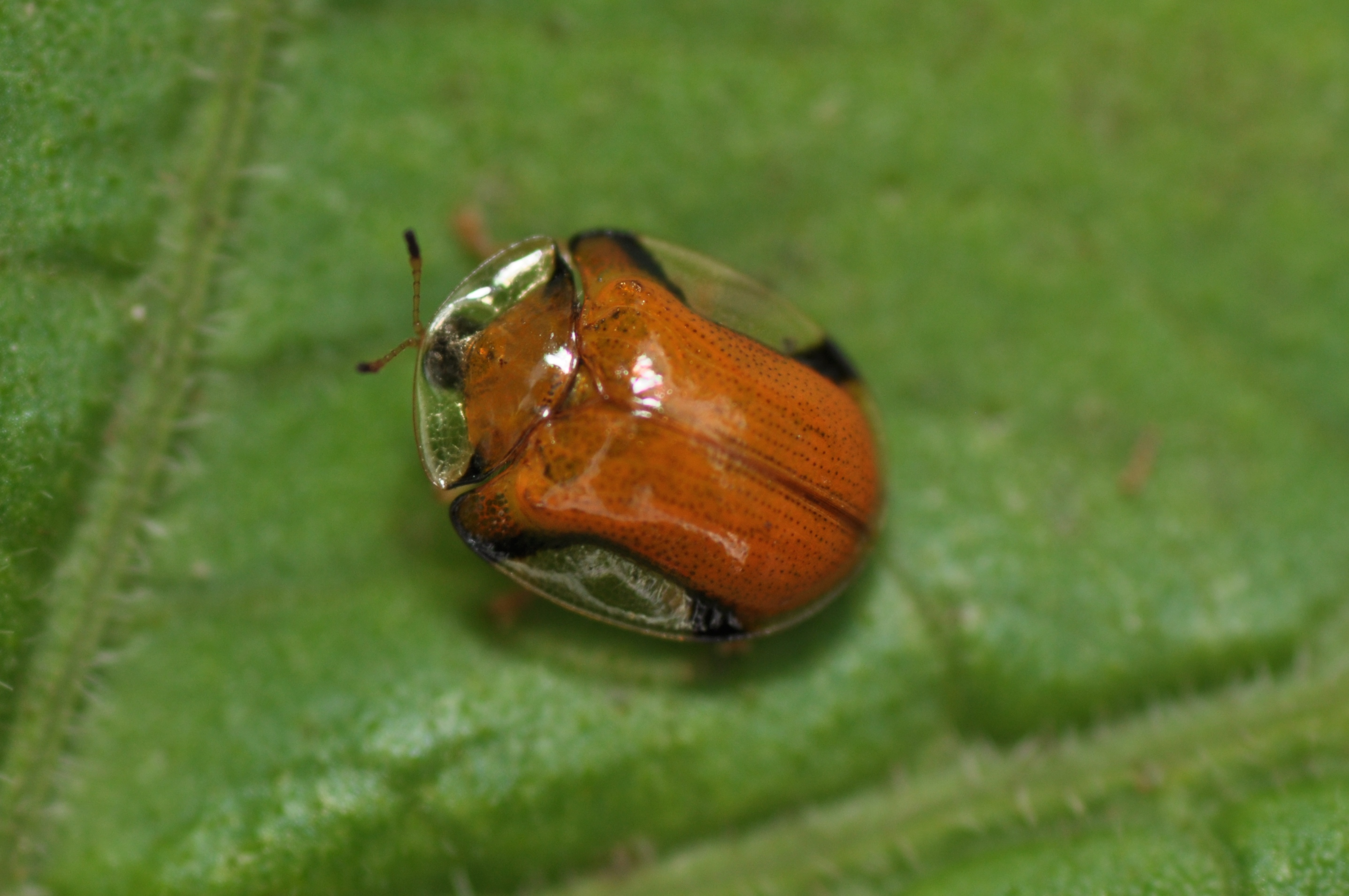

Scientific classification
- Kingdom: Animalia
- Phylum: Arthropoda
- Clade: Pancrustacea
- Class: Insecta
- Order: Coleoptera
- Suborder: Polyphaga
- Infraorder: Cucujiformia
- Family: Chrysomelidae
- Subfamily: Cassidinae
- Tribe: Cassidini
- Genus: Charidotella; Weise, 1896

Diversity
- at least 100 species

= Charidotella =

Genus of beetles

Charidotella is a genus of tortoise beetles in the family Chrysomelidae. There are at least 100 described species in Charidotella.

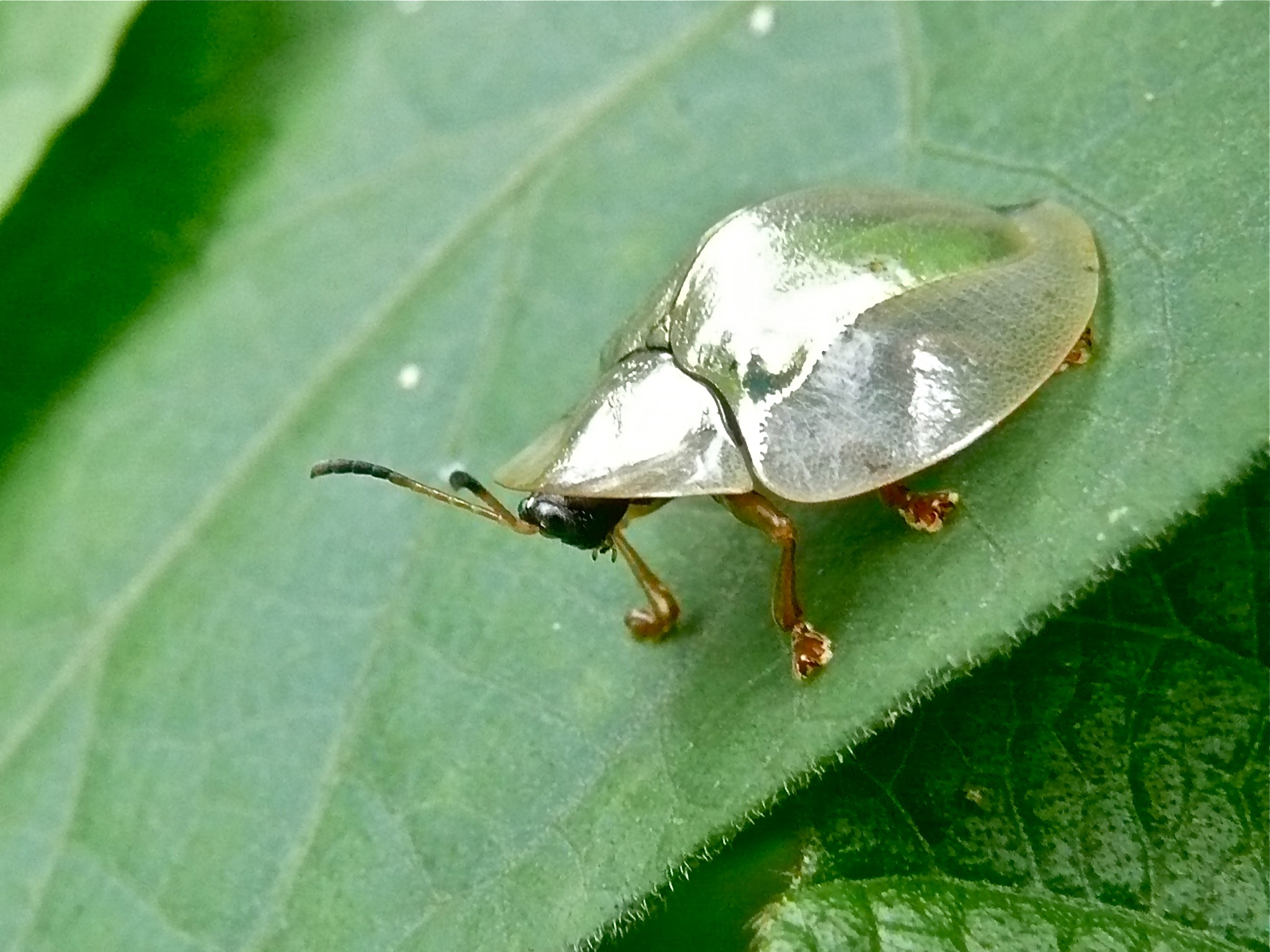

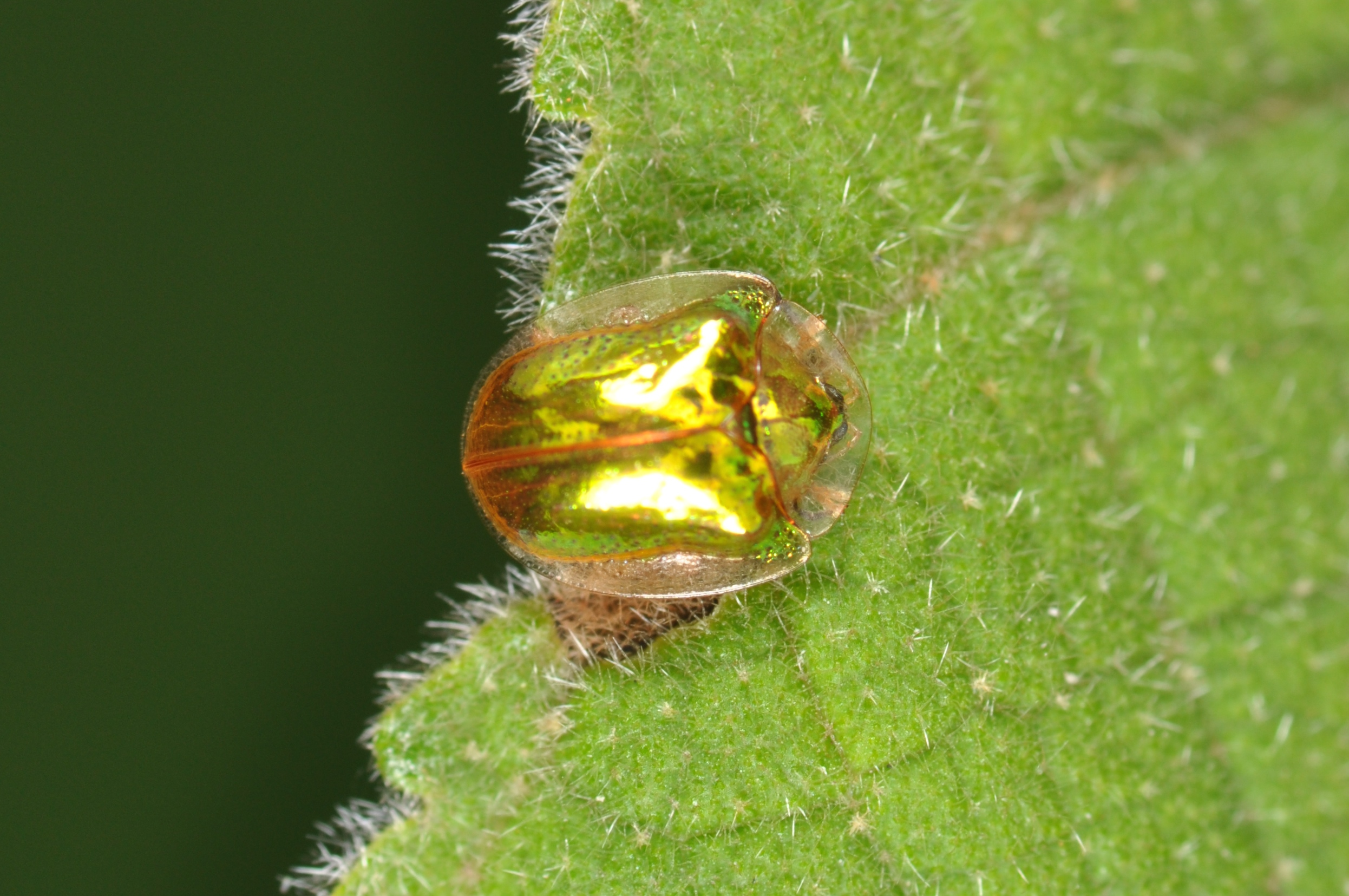

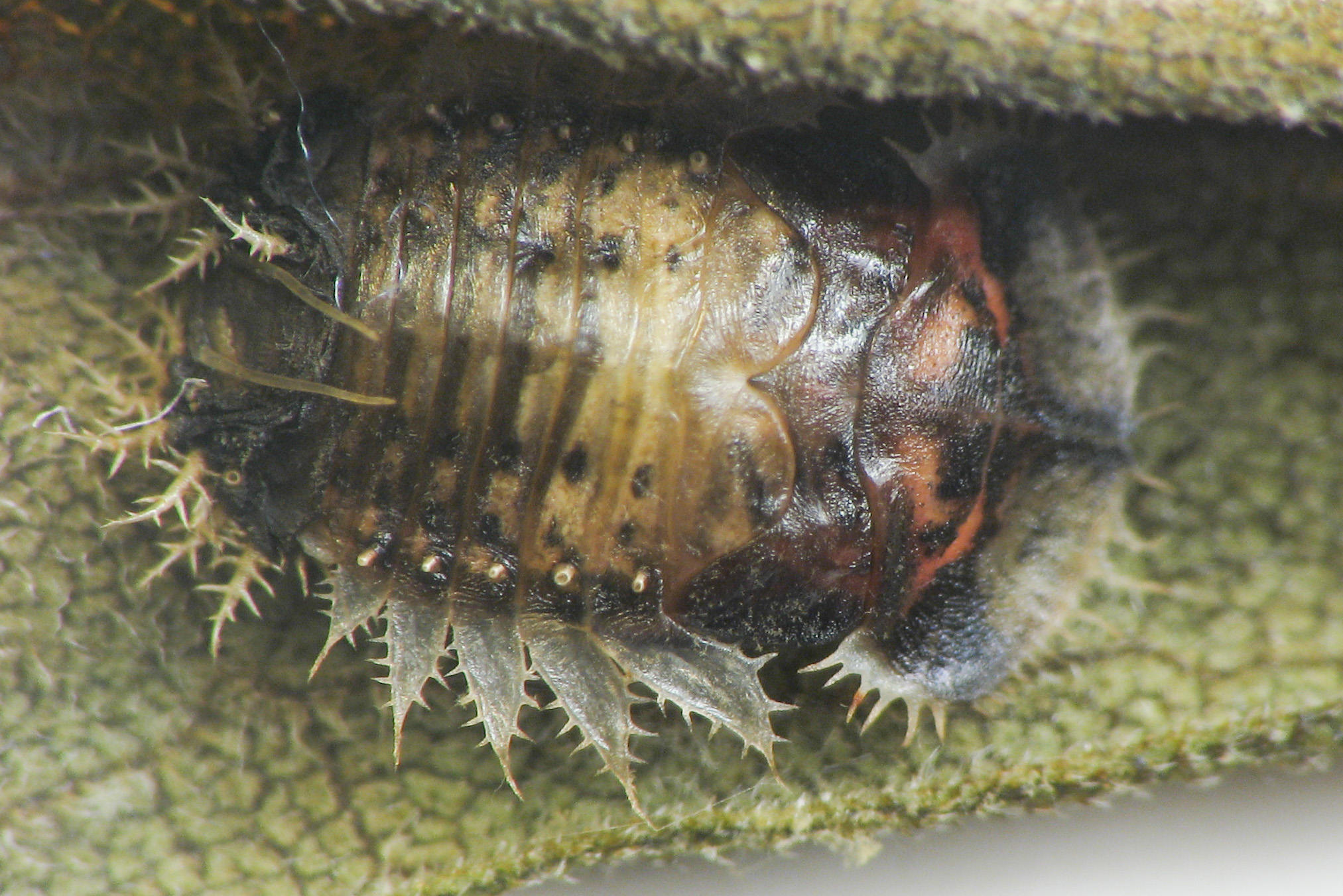
Charidotella sexpunctata pupa

== See also ==
- List of Charidotella species
