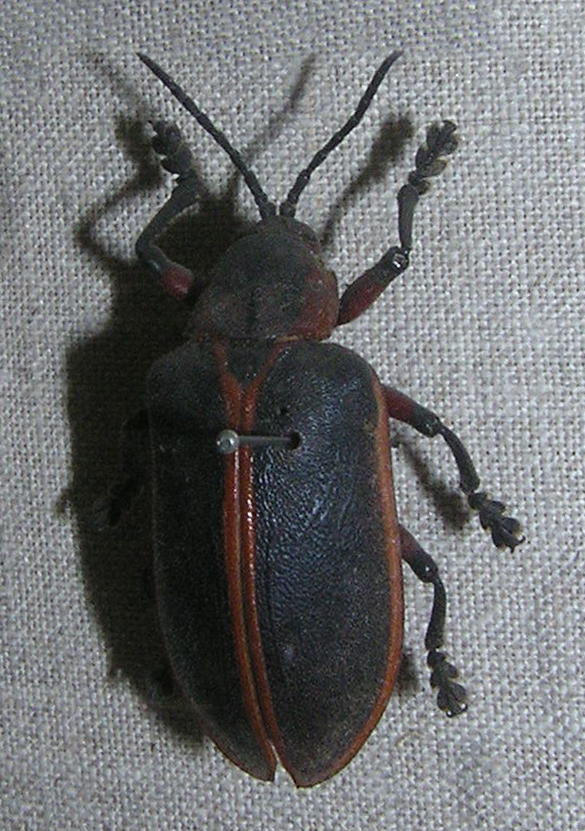

Scientific classification
- Kingdom: Animalia
- Phylum: Arthropoda
- Clade: Pancrustacea
- Class: Insecta
- Order: Coleoptera
- Suborder: Polyphaga
- Infraorder: Cucujiformia
- Family: Chrysomelidae
- Subfamily: Cassidinae
- Tribe: Alurnini
- Genus: Mecistomela; Jacobson, 1899
- Species: M. marginata

Binomial name
- Mecistomela marginata (Thunberg, 1821)

Synonyms
- Alurnus marginata Thunberg, 1821; Hispa bordée Latreille, 1829; Mecistomela marginata brevenotata Pic, 1922; Mecistomela marginata corallina Pic, Blackwelder, 1946; Mecistomela marginata dissecta Jacobson, 1899; Mecistomela marginata reducta Pic, 1922; Alurnus circumdata Schönherr, 1837; Alurnus cruciata Thunberg, 1821

= Mecistomela =

Genus of beetles

Mecistomela is a genus of leaf beetles in the family Chrysomelidae. It is monotypic, being represented by the single species, Mecistomela marginata, which is found in Brazil (Bahia, Distrito Federal, Goiás, Minas Gerais, Paraná, Rio de Janeiro, Santa Catarina, São Paulo).

== Description ==
Adults reach a length of about 23–34 mm. Adults are black, with the pronotum and elytron with orange markings.

== Biology ==
They have been recorded feeding on Arecastrum romanoffianum, Allagoptera arenaria, Cocos nucifera, Diplothemium species, Livistona species (including Livistona chinensis), Copernicia species, Elaeis guineensis, Phoenix species, Cocos botyophora and Cocos campestris.
