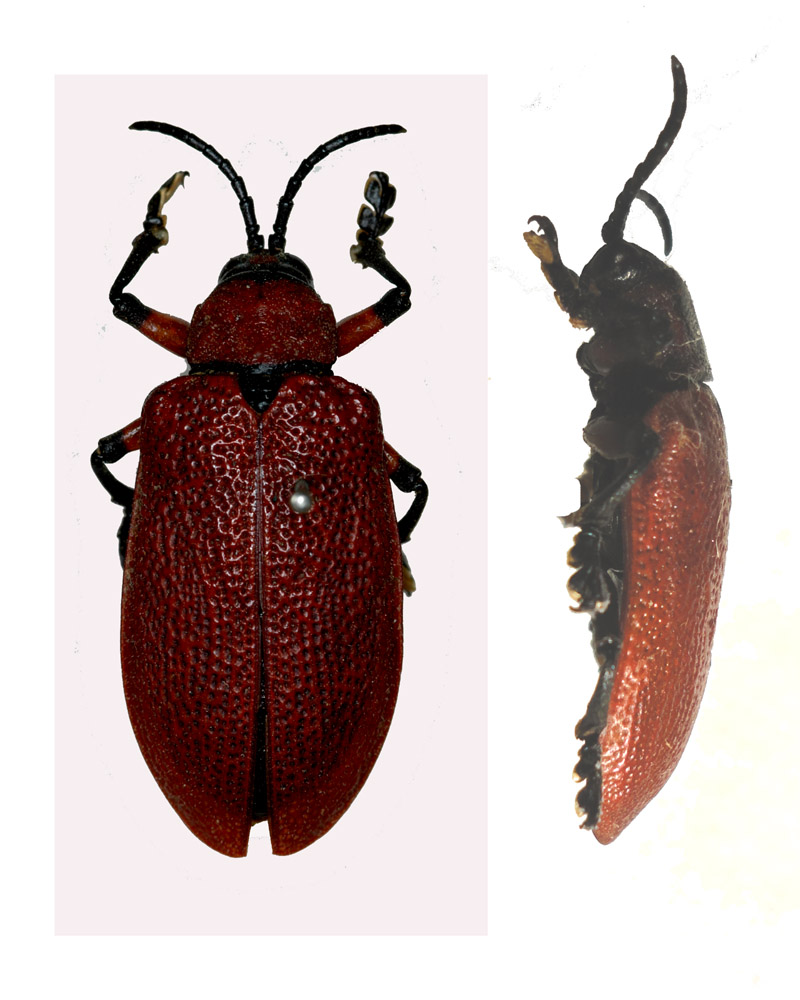

Scientific classification
- Kingdom: Animalia
- Phylum: Arthropoda
- Clade: Pancrustacea
- Class: Insecta
- Order: Coleoptera
- Suborder: Polyphaga
- Infraorder: Cucujiformia
- Family: Chrysomelidae
- Genus: Coraliomela
- Species: C. brunnea

Binomial name
- Coraliomela brunnea (Thunberg, 1821)

Synonyms
- Alurnus brunnea Thunberg, 1821; Alurnus alternans Gistl, 1831; Alurnus coccineus Vigors, 1837; Alurnus collaris Guérin-Méneville, 1840; Mecistomela corallina bijuncta Pic, 1922; Mecistomela (Coraliomela) corallina nigerrima Jacobson, 1899; Alurnus cruentatus Dejean, 1837; Alurnus nigripes Guérin-Méneville, 1840; Alurnus okeni Gistl, 1837; Mecistomela (Coraliomela) thoracica ruficollis Jacobson, 1899; Alurnus sanguineus Dejean, 1837; Mecistomela (Coraliomela) thoracica phenax Jacobson, 1899; Alurnus thoracicus Perty, 1832; Mecistomela (Coraliomela) thoracica maculata Jacobson, 1899; Mecistomela (Coraliomela) thoracica trinotata Berg, 1900; Mecistomela (Coraliomela) thoracica quinquenotata Berg, 1900; Alurnus vigorsii Dejean, 1837

= Coraliomela brunnea =

Species of beetle

Coraliomela brunnea is a species of beetle of the family Chrysomelidae. It is found in Uruguay, Argentina, Bolivia, Brazil (Amazonas, Bahia, Goiás, Maranhão, Minas Gerais, Mato Grosso, Pará, Paraiba, Pernambuco, Piauí, Rio Grande do Norte, Rio Grande do Sul, Rio de Janeiro, Rondonia, São Paulo, Sergipe) and Paraguay.

== Biology ==
They have been recorded feeding on Cocos nucifera, Syagrus romanzoffiana, Syagrus schizophylla, Syagrus coronata, Syagrus vagans, Allagoptera arenaria, Phoenix dactylifera, Copernicia cerifera, Arecastrum romanzoffianum, Euterpe edulis, Euterpe oleracea, Elaeis guineensis, Cocos coronata, Cocos schizophylla, Cocos vagans, Diplothemium maritimum and Diplothemium caudescens.
