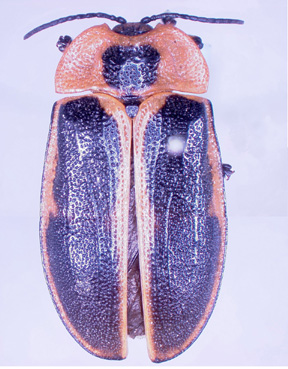

Scientific classification
- Kingdom: Animalia
- Phylum: Arthropoda
- Clade: Pancrustacea
- Class: Insecta
- Order: Coleoptera
- Suborder: Polyphaga
- Infraorder: Cucujiformia
- Family: Chrysomelidae
- Genus: Platyauchenia
- Species: P. latreillei

Binomial name
- Platyauchenia latreillei (Castelnau, 1840)

Synonyms
- Cassida latreillei Castelnau, 1840; Sphaeropalpus cinctus Dejean, 1837; Sphaeropalpus deyrollei Baly, 1866; Platyauchenia limbata Strum, 1843; Platyauchenia titubans Dohrn, 1880; Platyauchenia quinquemaculata Pic, 1921

= Platyauchenia latreillei =

Species of beetle

Platyauchenia latreillei is a species of beetle of the family Chrysomelidae. It is found in Brazil.

== Biology ==
They have been recorded feeding on Cocos nucifera, Diplothemium caudescens and Cocos botryophora.
