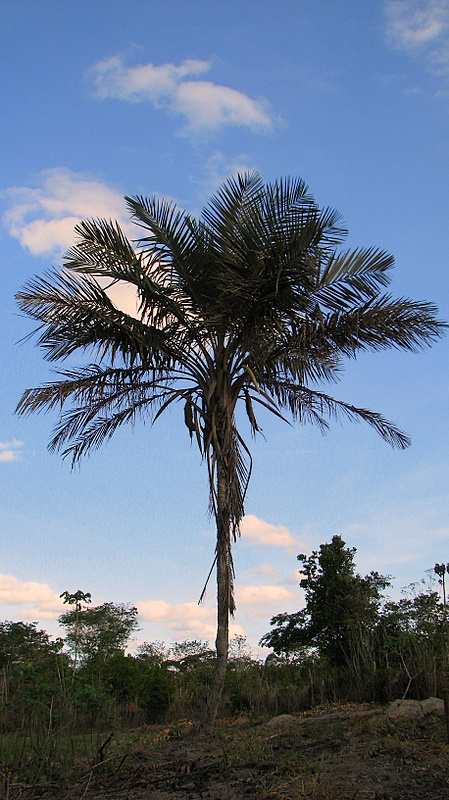

Scientific classification
- Kingdom: Plantae
- Clade: Tracheophytes
- Clade: Angiosperms
- Clade: Monocots
- Clade: Commelinids
- Order: Arecales
- Family: Arecaceae
- Genus: Allagoptera
- Species: A. caudescens

Binomial name
- Allagoptera caudescens (Mart.) Kuntze

Synonyms
- Diplothemium caudescens Mart.; Diplothemium pectinatum Barb.Rodr.; Orania nivea Linden ex W.Watson; Polyandrococos caudescens (Mart.) Barb.Rodr.; Polyandrococos pectinata (Barb.Rodr.) Barb.Rodr.

= Allagoptera caudescens =

Species of palm

Allagoptera caudescens is a species of flowering plant in the palm family endemic to Brazil, where it is known as buri palm. The older name Polyandrococos combines the Greek words for "many" and "anther" with the name of another palm genus Cocos, and the epithet is Latin for "bearlike", referring to the hairy tomentum. It was formerly classified as Polyandrococos caudescens, the only species in the genus Polyandrococos.

== Description ==
The trunks are rough and solitary natured, and reach over 10 m at 20 cm wide, usually covered in old leaf bases. The sheath is tubular, splitting adaxially, striate, and covered in white and brown tomentum. The petiole is short, deeply channeled, flattened below, with armed margins and similar tomentum; the rachis is slightly arched, leaflets regular or grouped, in one or several planes with one fold. The undersides are glaucous, the apex is irregularly bifid, the midrib is prominent and the veinlets are evident.

The inflorescence is a pendulous, solitary, interfoliar spike, unbranched, with an elongated peduncle and a tubular prophyll. The prophyll is two-keeled, short and fibrous and is much smaller than the single peduncular bract, which is deeply grooved with a long beak. The lower half of the length of the rachis is covered in triads while the top has pairs of staminate flowers which shed early, leaving the inflorescence tip bare at antithesis. The bracts around the triads are pointed and ovate; those around the pairs have longer points. The bracts are adnate to the rachis and adjacent bracts forming depressions around the pairs; the bracteoles are inconspicuous.

The staminate flowers are long and asymmetrical with three linear, triangular sepals, basally connate and adnate to the receptacle. They have three pointed, obovoid petals, which are elongated, valvate, and longer, wider and thicker than the sepals. The stamens are numerous, from 60 to 100, irregularly inserted, with cylindrical, elongated, flexible filaments which are bent and twisted, occasionally joined, apiculate, and dorsifixed a third of their length. The pollen is elliptic and monosulcate with finely reticulate, tectate exine.

The pistillate are smaller, the three distinct sepals are ovate, broadly imbricate, with pointed tips, the three petals are similar but with longer tips. The staminodes are united in an irregular ring, the gynoecium is triocular, triovulate with short trifid stigmas and laterally attached ovules. The fruit is egg-shaped, with three pores, green to yellow, carrying a single seed. The epicarp is smooth, the mesocarp is fleshy and fibrous and the endocarp is thick and bony. The seed is basally attached and beaked with a shallowly ruminate endosperm and a subbasal embryo.

== Distribution and habitat ==
They are limited to east-central Brazil where they grow in gallery forest and open plains up to the Atlantic coastal forests.
