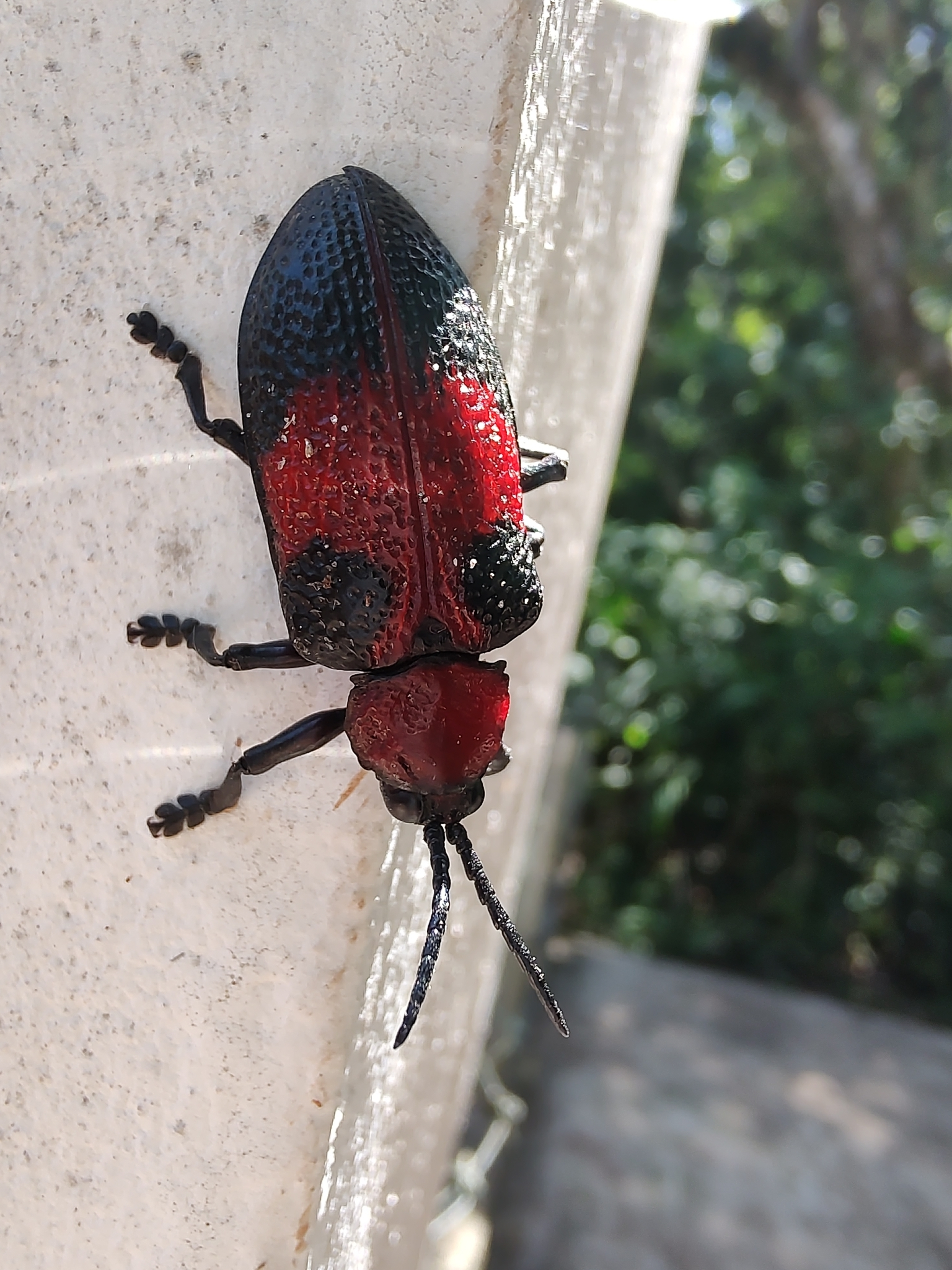

Scientific classification
- Kingdom: Animalia
- Phylum: Arthropoda
- Clade: Pancrustacea
- Class: Insecta
- Order: Coleoptera
- Suborder: Polyphaga
- Infraorder: Cucujiformia
- Family: Chrysomelidae
- Genus: Coraliomela
- Species: C. aeneoplagiata

Binomial name
- Coraliomela aeneoplagiata (Lucas, 1859)

Synonyms
- Alurnus aeneoplagiata Lucas, 1859; Psilurnus bicoloripes Pic, 1922; Silurnus consanguinea Weise, 1900; Psilurnus donckieri Weise, 1905; Mecistomela (Coraliomela) quadrimaculata lucasi Jacobson, 1899

= Coraliomela aeneoplagiata =

Species of beetle

Coraliomela aeneoplagiata is a species of beetle of the family Chrysomelidae. It is found in Brazil (Goyaz, São Paulo).

== Biology ==
They have been recorded feeding on various species of palm, including Euterpe edulis and Euterpe oleracea.
