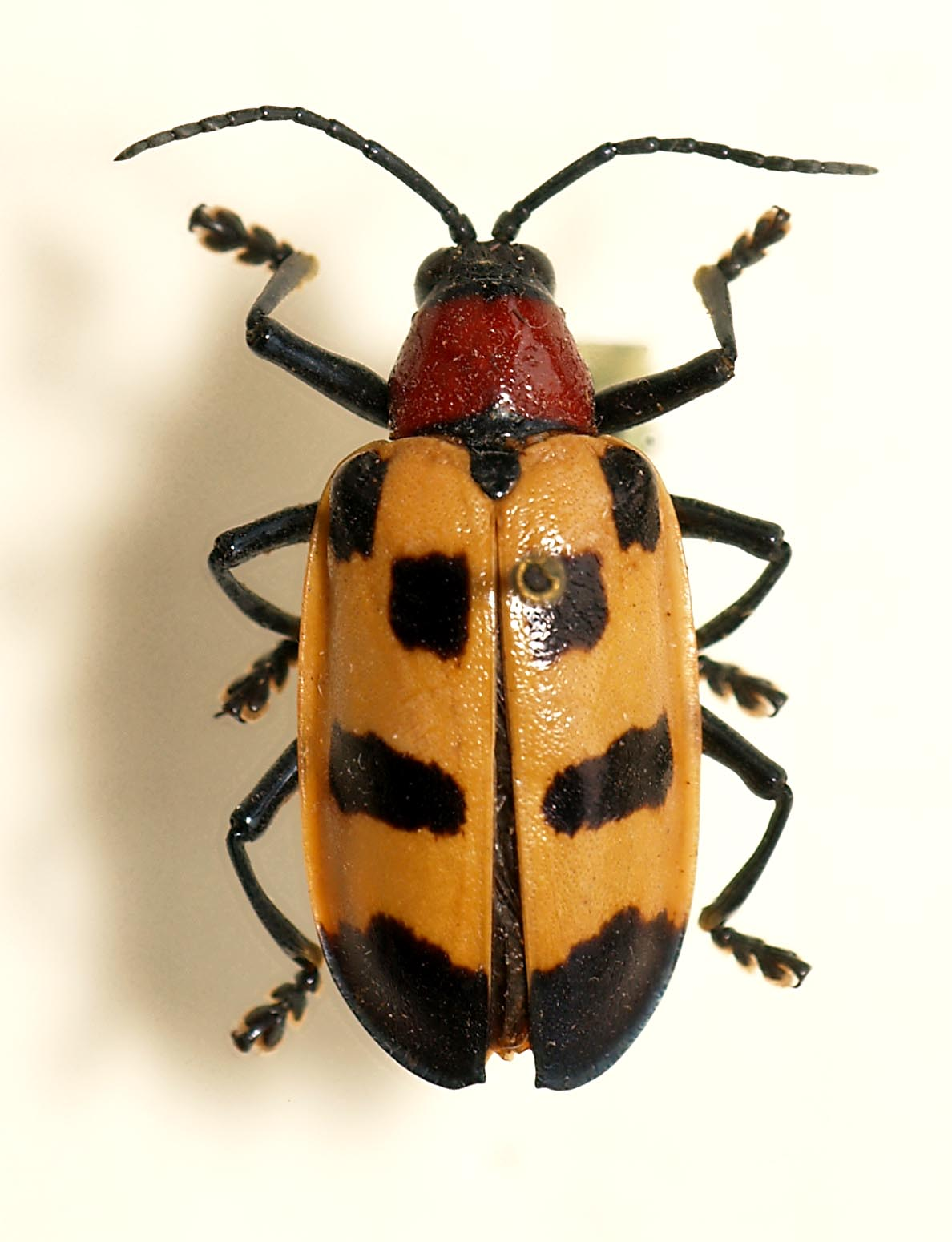
- Alurnus ornatus

Scientific classification
- Kingdom: Animalia
- Phylum: Arthropoda
- Class: Insecta
- Order: Coleoptera
- Suborder: Polyphaga
- Infraorder: Cucujiformia
- Family: Chrysomelidae
- Subfamily: Cassidinae
- Tribe: Alurnini; Chapuis, 1875

Genera
- see text

= Alurnini =

Tribe of leaf beetles

Alurnini is a tribe of leaf beetles within the subfamily Cassidinae.

== Genera ==
- Adalurnus Maulik, 1936
- Alurnus Fabricius, 1775
- Coraliomela Jacobson, 1899
- Mecistomela Jacobson, 1899
- Platyauchenia Sturm, 1843
- Pseudocalaspidea Jacobson, 1899
