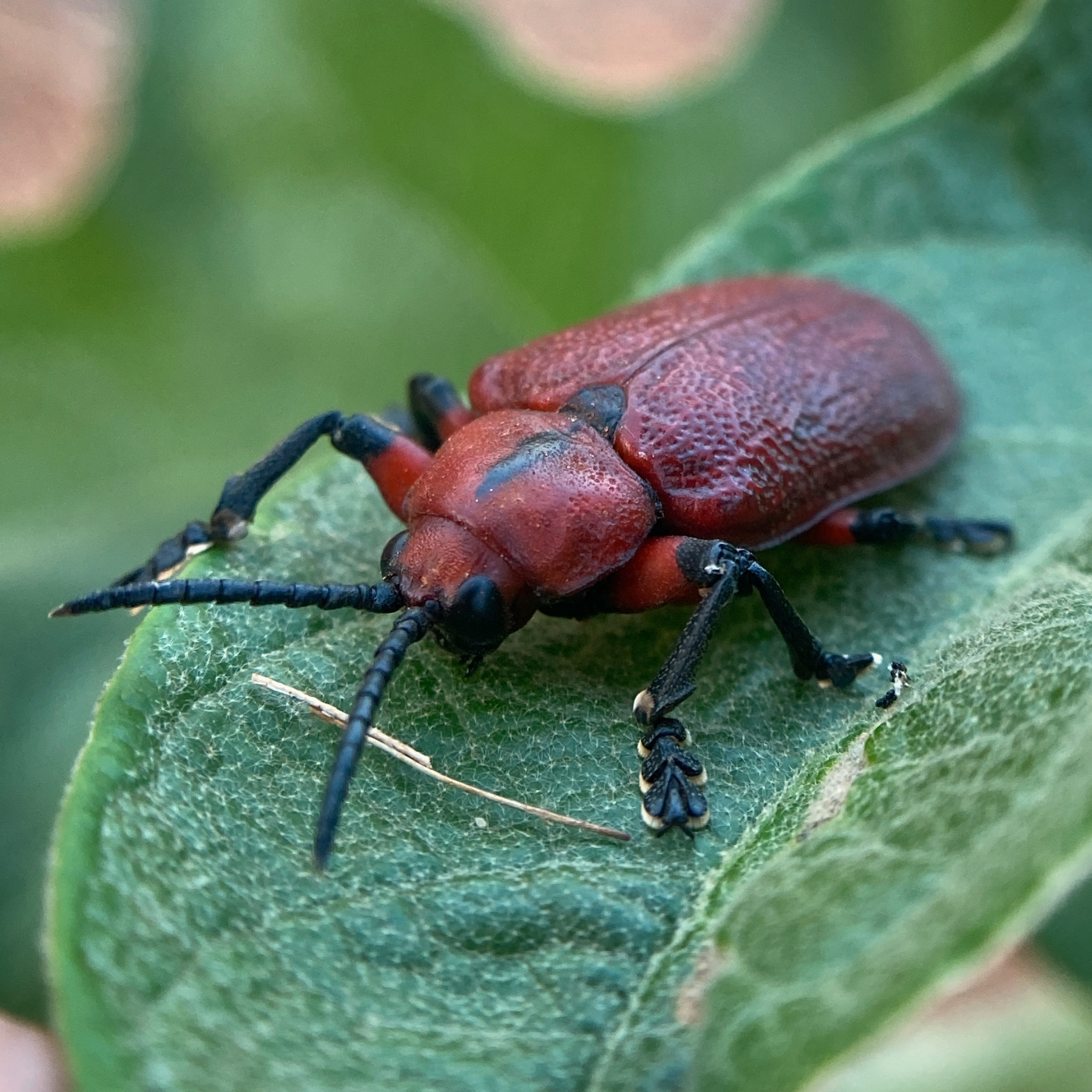
- Coraliomela brunnea

Scientific classification
- Kingdom: Animalia
- Phylum: Arthropoda
- Clade: Pancrustacea
- Class: Insecta
- Order: Coleoptera
- Suborder: Polyphaga
- Infraorder: Cucujiformia
- Family: Chrysomelidae
- Subfamily: Cassidinae
- Tribe: Alurnini
- Genus: Coraliomela; Jacobson, 1899

Synonyms
- Silurnus Weise, 1900; Psilurnus Weise, 1910

= Coraliomela =

Genus of leaf beetles

Coraliomela is a genus of beetles belonging to the family Chrysomelidae.

== Species ==
- Coraliomela aeneoplagiata (Lucas, 1859)
- Coraliomela brunnea (Thunberg, 1821)
- Coraliomela quadrimaculata (Guérin-Méneville, 1840)
- Coraliomela vicina (Guérin-Méneville, 1840)
