= Platyauchenia ruficollis =

Scientific classification
- Kingdom: Animalia
- Phylum: Arthropoda
- Clade: Pancrustacea
- Class: Insecta
- Order: Coleoptera
- Suborder: Polyphaga
- Infraorder: Cucujiformia
- Family: Chrysomelidae
- Genus: Platyauchenia
- Species: P. ruficollis

Binomial name
- Platyauchenia ruficollis Staines, 2007

Species of beetle

Platyauchenia ruficollis is a species of beetle of the family Chrysomelidae. It is found in Brazil.
