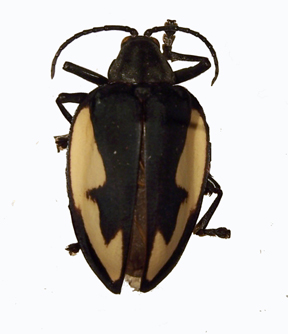

Scientific classification
- Kingdom: Animalia
- Phylum: Arthropoda
- Clade: Pancrustacea
- Class: Insecta
- Order: Coleoptera
- Suborder: Polyphaga
- Infraorder: Cucujiformia
- Family: Chrysomelidae
- Subfamily: Cassidinae
- Tribe: Alurnini
- Genus: Pseudocalaspidea; Jacobson, 1899
- Species: P. cassidea

Binomial name
- Pseudocalaspidea cassidea (Westwood, 1842)

Synonyms
- Alurnus cassidea Westwood, 1842; Pseudocalaspidea atrocinctus Pic, 1934; Pseudocalaspidea atrocinctus disjuncta Pic, 1934; Alurnus divisus Pic, 1922; Pseudocalaspidea cassidea jacobsoni Csiki, 1900; Pseudocalaspidea cassidea waterhousei Jacobson, 1899; Pseudocalaspidea cassidea westwoodi Jacobson, 1899

= Pseudocalaspidea =

Genus of beetles

Pseudocalaspidea is a genus of leaf beetles in the family Chrysomelidae. It is monotypic, being represented by the single species, Pseudocalaspidea cassidea, which is found in Colombia, Ecuador and Peru.

== Description ==
Adults reach a length of about 20-25 mm.
