= Coraliomela vicina =

Scientific classification
- Kingdom: Animalia
- Phylum: Arthropoda
- Clade: Pancrustacea
- Class: Insecta
- Order: Coleoptera
- Suborder: Polyphaga
- Infraorder: Cucujiformia
- Family: Chrysomelidae
- Genus: Coraliomela
- Species: C. vicina

Binomial name
- Coraliomela vicina (Guérin-Méneville, 1840)

Synonyms
- Alurnus vicinus Guérin-Méneville, 1840; Mecistomela (Coraliomela) vicina var. bisignata Berg, 1900

Species of beetle

Coraliomela vicina is a species of beetle of the family Chrysomelidae. It is found in Bolivia and Brazil.

== Description ==
Adults are red, with the elytra much more sparingly punctured than in any of the related red species. The punctures are deeply impressed and oblong.
