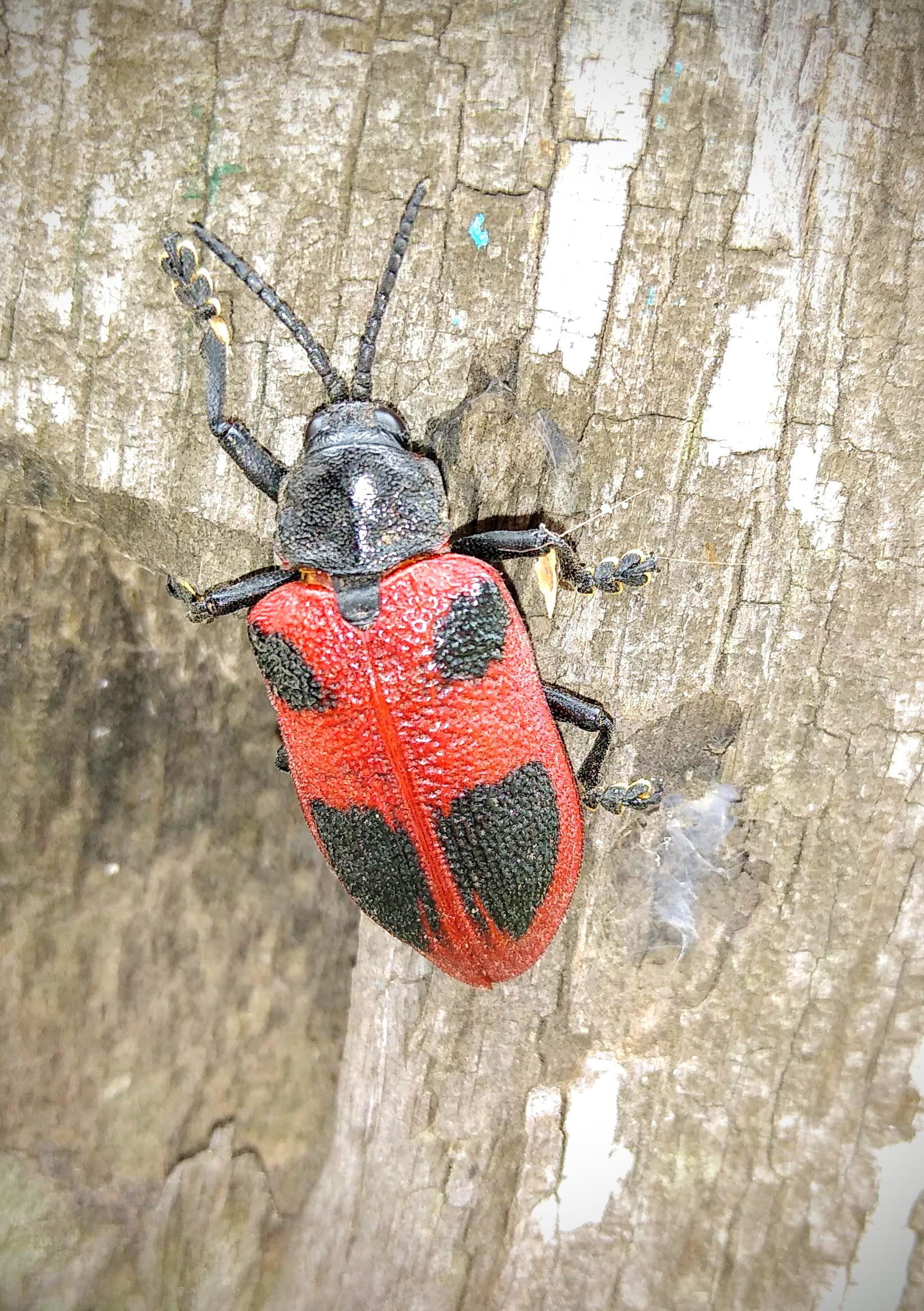

Scientific classification
- Kingdom: Animalia
- Phylum: Arthropoda
- Clade: Pancrustacea
- Class: Insecta
- Order: Coleoptera
- Suborder: Polyphaga
- Infraorder: Cucujiformia
- Family: Chrysomelidae
- Genus: Coraliomela
- Species: C. quadrimaculata

Binomial name
- Coraliomela quadrimaculata (Guérin-Méneville, 1840)

Synonyms
- Alurnus quadrimaculatus Guérin-Méneville, 1840; Alurnus silbermanni Guérin-Méneville, 1840; Mecistomela (Coraliomela) quadrimaculata bimaculata Weise, 1905

= Coraliomela quadrimaculata =

Species of beetle

Coraliomela quadrimaculata is a species of beetle of the family Chrysomelidae. It is found in Argentina, Brazil and Paraguay.

== Biology ==
They have been recorded feeding on Cocos ramanzoffiana, Cocos eriospatha, Cocos coronata, Cocos nucifera, Phoenix species (including Phoenix dactylifera), Attalea concentrista and Euterpe edulis.
