= Platyauchenia =

Scientific classification
- Kingdom: Animalia
- Phylum: Arthropoda
- Clade: Pancrustacea
- Class: Insecta
- Order: Coleoptera
- Suborder: Polyphaga
- Infraorder: Cucujiformia
- Family: Chrysomelidae
- Subfamily: Cassidinae
- Tribe: Alurnini
- Genus: Platyauchenia; Sturm, 1843

Synonyms
- Sphaeropalpus Dejean, 1837; Sphaeropalpus Guérin-Méneville, 1844

Genus of leaf beetles

Platyauchenia is a genus of beetles belonging to the family Chrysomelidae.

== Species ==
- Platyauchenia latreillei (Castelnau, 1840)
- Platyauchenia ruficollis Staines, 2007
