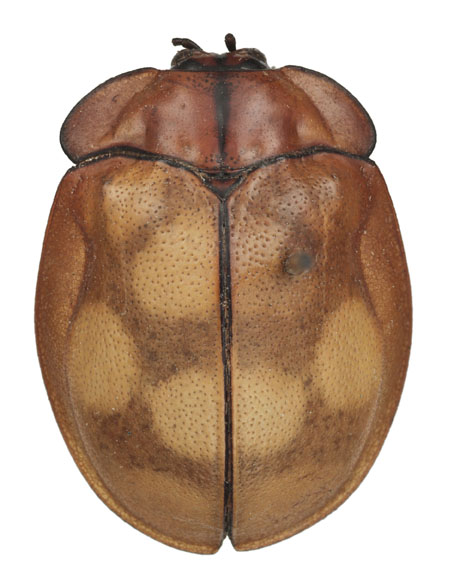

Scientific classification
- Kingdom: Animalia
- Phylum: Arthropoda
- Clade: Pancrustacea
- Class: Insecta
- Order: Coleoptera
- Suborder: Polyphaga
- Infraorder: Cucujiformia
- Family: Chrysomelidae
- Subfamily: Cassidinae
- Tribe: Alurnini
- Genus: Adalurnus; Maulik, 1936
- Species: A. rotundatus

Binomial name
- Adalurnus rotundatus Maulik, 1936

= Adalurnus =

Genus of beetles

Adalurnus is a genus of leaf beetles in the family Chrysomelidae. It is monotypic, being represented by the single species, Adalurnus rotundatus, which is found in Brazil (Para).

== Description ==
Adults reach a length of about 13-25 mm.
