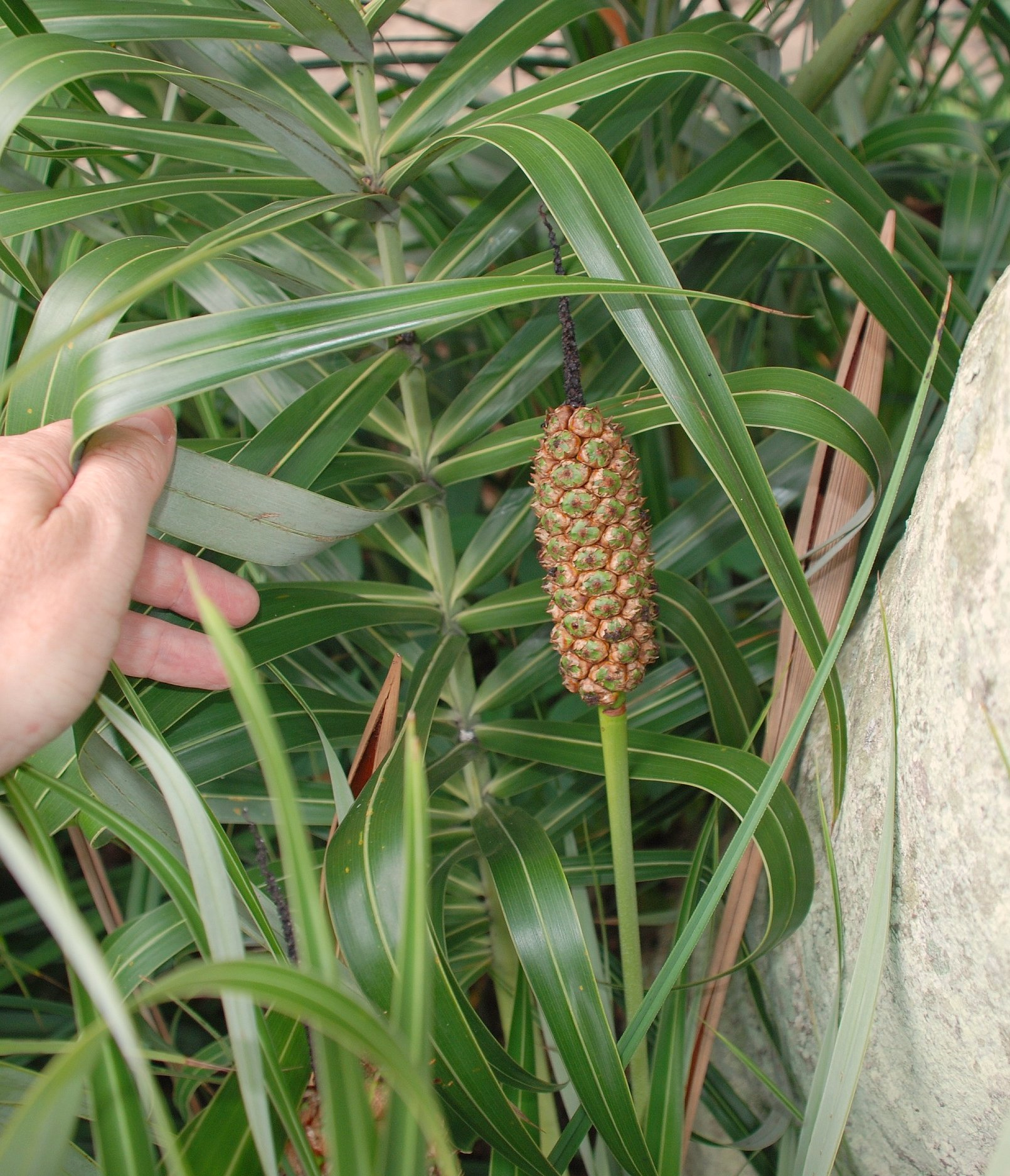
- Allagoptera arenaria

Scientific classification
- Kingdom: Plantae
- Clade: Embryophytes
- Clade: Tracheophytes
- Clade: Angiosperms
- Clade: Monocots
- Clade: Commelinids
- Order: Arecales
- Family: Arecaceae
- Subfamily: Arecoideae
- Tribe: Cocoseae
- Subtribe: Attaleinae
- Genus: Allagoptera; Nees

Type species
- Allagoptera arenaria Kuntze

Species
- Allagoptera arenaria; Allagoptera brevicalyx; Allagoptera campestris; Allagoptera caudescens; Allagoptera leucocalyx

Synonyms
- Diplothemium Mart.; Diplothenium Voigt; Polyandrococos Barb.Rodr.

= Allagoptera =

Genus of palms

Allagoptera is a monoecious genus of flowering plant in the palm family. It is native to South America and has five accepted species. Compared to other genera within the Cocoseae Allagoptera is described as particularly specialized. The genus name is a Greek combination of "change" and "feather", describing the full leaf; it was formerly named Diplothemium.

== Description ==
Allagoptera produces very short or acaulescent trunks and in cases where the trunk grows erect it often makes a downward turn leaving the crown below the trunk-base. The trunks in Allagoptera are among the few in the palm family which tend to bifurcate, producing multiple heads per unit. The pinnate leaves are gently arching to 2 m and are carried on long, slender petioles which are adaxially channeled. The single-fold leaflets are regularly or irregularly arranged on the rachis each protruding into a different plane, creating a plumose leaf. The unusual spicate inflorescence emerges from within the leaf-crown carrying the pistilate flowers basally with the staminate flowers growing distally. The single-seeded fruit is yellow to brown, growing in crowded clusters.

== Species ==
Image	Scientific name	Distribution
	Allagoptera arenaria	Atlantic Coast of Brazil
	Allagoptera brevicalyx	Bahia, Brazil
	Allagoptera campestris	Argentina, Brazil, Paraguay.
	Allagoptera caudescens	Brazil
	Allagoptera leucocalyx	Paraguay, Bolivia, Brazil, Argentina

== Distribution and habitat ==
Palms in this genus are found in Brazil, Paraguay, Bolivia, and Argentina growing in a variety of habitats. Some thrive in sandy beaches and dunes, while others are found in woodlands; Allagoptera species are also common along sandstone hills and in the Cerrado vegetation.
