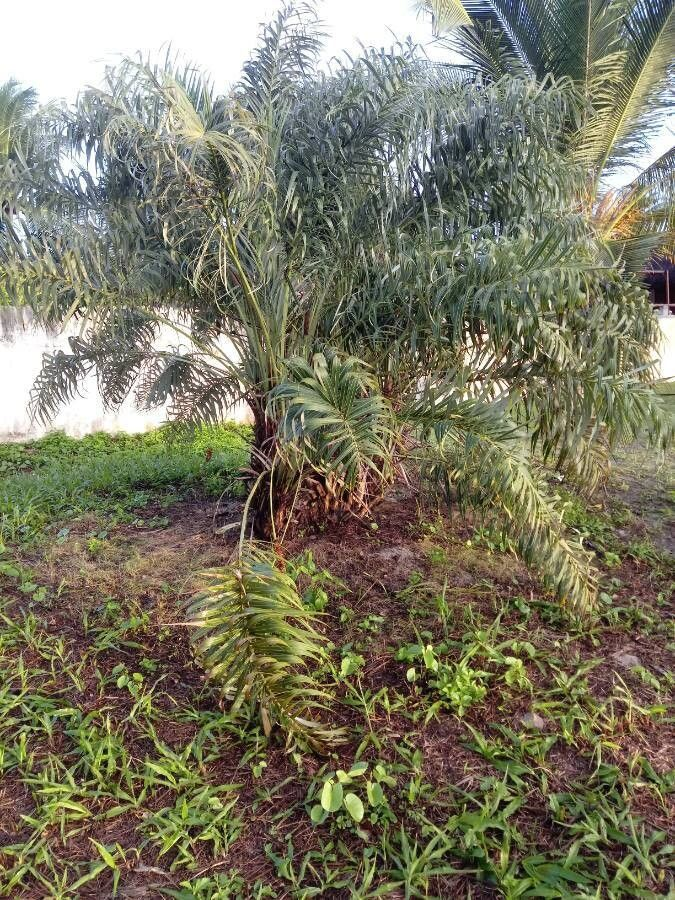

Scientific classification
- Kingdom: Plantae
- Clade: Tracheophytes
- Clade: Angiosperms
- Clade: Monocots
- Clade: Commelinids
- Order: Arecales
- Family: Arecaceae
- Genus: Allagoptera
- Species: A. arenaria

Binomial name
- Allagoptera arenaria Kuntze

= Allagoptera arenaria =

Species of palm

Allagoptera arenaria, popularly known as seashore palm, is a fruit tree native to the Atlantic Coast of Brazil. It grows in coastal strand, just above the high tide mark, and is widely cultivated as an ornamental throughout South America.

Allagoptera arenaria is relatively short, reaching about 6 feet (1.8 m) tall. The plant is monoecious, with male and female plants in distinct spirals in the same spike. The leaves emerge right out of the ground from a subterranean trunk that is rarely visible, and grow in a swirling pattern, spreading out on different and seemingly random planes. There are 6–15 bright green to silvery green pinnately compound (feather-like) leaves 2–6 ft (0.61–1.83 m) long, with each leaflet about 2 ft (0.61 m) long. Its fruits are yellowish green and shaped like small coconuts, about 1 inch (25 mm) long and 0.5 in (13 mm) in diameter.

== Etymology ==
The generic name of the seashore palm, Allogoptera, comes from the Ancient Greek words αλλαγή (allage), meaning change, and πτερόν (pteron), meaning wing, and refers to the swirled, changing pattern of the feathery leaves. The species name, arenaria comes from the Latin, for "sandy" or growing in sandy sites.

== Uses ==
Allagoptera arenaria is cultivated extensively in South America for the edible fruits which are eaten fresh or made into a drink or jam. The leaves are used to make baskets and other woven objects.

=== Horticulture ===
Allagoptera arenaria is one of the best palms for beach and coastal situations in subtropical and tropical settings. It requires moderate to full sunlight and is used as a beach screen, being very tolerant of extreme coastal and beach exposure, as well as salt spray. In its native environment, the seashore palm is highly tolerant of poor soils that have good drainage, thriving in soils that are thoroughly moist. Considered a slow grower when it is young, the seashore palm propagates by seeds and responds well to fertilizer and water.
