= Uroplata rectangula =

Scientific classification
- Kingdom: Animalia
- Phylum: Arthropoda
- Clade: Pancrustacea
- Class: Insecta
- Order: Coleoptera
- Suborder: Polyphaga
- Infraorder: Cucujiformia
- Family: Chrysomelidae
- Genus: Uroplata
- Species: U. rectangula

Binomial name
- Uroplata rectangula Uhmann, 1953

Synonyms
- Uroplata girardi f. rectangula Uhmann, 1953

Species of beetle

Uroplata rectangula is a species of beetle of the family Chrysomelidae. It is found in Brazil (Bahia, Pernambuco).

== Taxonomy ==
Uhmann described Uroplata girardi f. rectangula from Bahia in 1953, based on two specimens and the taxon was never further assessed. The form rectangula differs from the typical girardi in having elytral margins subparallel without lateroapical lamina projecting beyond the outline of the elytra. This character was clearly illustrated and mentioned by Uhmann, yet he considered the name as a form of girardi. The name rectangula is available as it was proposed before 1961 and automatically deems subspecific rank. It belongs to the complicated serrulata-species group, yet rectangula is very characteristic as it has a rectangular body shape, which is present, within the group, only in Uroplata rudis. The latter differs in extremely coarse punctation of the elytra and large denticles on the lateral and apical margins of the elytra. Other species of the group have either rounded lateroapical angles of the elytra or expanded into a projecting lamina, which is the case of girardi. Indeed, these characters might be subtle and further complex study would be necessary but on the other hand rectangula is more distinct than other species of the group that are listed as valid by Uhmann. Because rectangula is distinctive within the species-group and to avoid any confusion with girardi, it was raised to species status in 2026.
