= Hispa andrewesi =

Scientific classification
- Kingdom: Animalia
- Phylum: Arthropoda
- Clade: Pancrustacea
- Class: Insecta
- Order: Coleoptera
- Suborder: Polyphaga
- Infraorder: Cucujiformia
- Family: Chrysomelidae
- Genus: Hispa
- Species: H. andrewesi

Binomial name
- Hispa andrewesi Weise, 1897

Synonyms
- Hispella andrewesi var. singhalensis Maulik, 1919; ?Hispa ceylonica Motschulsky, 1861

Species of beetle

Hispa andrewesi, is a species of leaf beetle native to India, Sri Lanka, Nepal, South China, and Myanmar.
