= Uroplata maura =

Scientific classification
- Kingdom: Animalia
- Phylum: Arthropoda
- Class: Insecta
- Order: Coleoptera
- Suborder: Polyphaga
- Infraorder: Cucujiformia
- Family: Chrysomelidae
- Genus: Uroplata
- Species: U. maura

Binomial name
- Uroplata maura (Fabricius, 1801)

Synonyms
- Hispa maura Fabricius, 1801

Species of beetle

Uroplata maura is a species of beetle of the family Chrysomelidae. It was described by Johan Christian Fabricius in 1801. In his description, the type location was given as America meridionali (which refers to the whole of South America). Since its description, the species has been transferred between various genera (Hispa, Pentispa, Euprionota and finally Uroplata).

== Biology ==
The food plant is unknown.
