= Baliosus lineaticollis =

Scientific classification
- Kingdom: Animalia
- Phylum: Arthropoda
- Clade: Pancrustacea
- Class: Insecta
- Order: Coleoptera
- Suborder: Polyphaga
- Infraorder: Cucujiformia
- Family: Chrysomelidae
- Genus: Baliosus
- Species: B. lineaticollis

Binomial name
- Baliosus lineaticollis (Baly, 1885)

Synonyms
- Chalepus lineaticollis Baly, 1885; Uroplata lineaticollis

Species of beetle

Baliosus lineaticollis is a species of beetle of the family Chrysomelidae. It is found in Guatemala and Mexico.

== Description ==
Adults are very similar to Uroplata fulvopustulata, but the thorax is narrower, subconic and not unicolorous. The antennae are blackish-piceous instead of fulvous, and, lastly, the produced hinder angles of the elytra are shorter and much more obtuse.
