= Uroplata nigritarsus =

Scientific classification
- Kingdom: Animalia
- Phylum: Arthropoda
- Class: Insecta
- Order: Coleoptera
- Suborder: Polyphaga
- Infraorder: Cucujiformia
- Family: Chrysomelidae
- Genus: Uroplata
- Species: U. nigritarsus

Binomial name
- Uroplata nigritarsus Weise, 1921

Synonyms
- Uroplata chilensis Pic, 1933

Species of beetle

Uroplata nigritarsus is a species of beetle of the family Chrysomelidae. It is found in Argentina, Brazil, Chile and Paraguay.

== Biology ==
The recorded food plant is Lippa geminata.
