= Uroplata triangula =

Scientific classification
- Kingdom: Animalia
- Phylum: Arthropoda
- Clade: Pancrustacea
- Class: Insecta
- Order: Coleoptera
- Suborder: Polyphaga
- Infraorder: Cucujiformia
- Family: Chrysomelidae
- Genus: Uroplata
- Species: U. triangula

Binomial name
- Uroplata triangula Uhmann, 1951

Species of beetle

Uroplata triangula is a species of beetle of the family Chrysomelidae. It is found in Brazil (Bahia).

== Biology ==
The recorded food plants are Bauhinia and Vernonia species.
