= Uroplata atricornis =

Scientific classification
- Kingdom: Animalia
- Phylum: Arthropoda
- Class: Insecta
- Order: Coleoptera
- Suborder: Polyphaga
- Infraorder: Cucujiformia
- Family: Chrysomelidae
- Genus: Uroplata
- Species: U. atricornis

Binomial name
- Uroplata atricornis (Pic, 1927)

Synonyms
- Probaenia atricornis Pic, 1927

Species of beetle

Uroplata atricornis is a species of beetle of the family Chrysomelidae. It is found in Argentina and Brazil.

== Description ==
Adults reach a length of about 6 mm. Adults are testaceous with metallic markings, black antennae and the head and thorax spotted with green. The elytron has many green spots, some partly joined.

== Biology ==
The recorded food plant is Vernonia mollissima.
