= Baliosus marmoratus =

Scientific classification
- Kingdom: Animalia
- Phylum: Arthropoda
- Clade: Pancrustacea
- Class: Insecta
- Order: Coleoptera
- Suborder: Polyphaga
- Infraorder: Cucujiformia
- Family: Chrysomelidae
- Genus: Baliosus
- Species: B. marmoratus

Binomial name
- Baliosus marmoratus (Baly, 1885)

Synonyms
- Chalepus marmoratus Baly, 1885

Species of beetle

Baliosus marmoratus is a species of beetle of the family Chrysomelidae. It is found in Costa Rica, El Salvador, Guatemala, Mexico, Nicaragua and Panama.

== Description ==
The vertex is smooth and impunctate, the front longitudinally sulcate and the interocular space moderately produced, obtuse. The antennae are rather longer than the head and thorax, robust and thickened towards the apex. The thorax is broader than long, the sides converging and slightly rounded from the base to the apex, obsoletely angulate. The disc is transversely convex, excavated transversely behind the middle, coarsely and closely punctured. The lateral margin (in some specimens) is narrowly edged with piceous. The elytra are broader than the thorax, the sides slightly enlarged from the base towards the apex, the latter obtuse. The margin is serrulate. Each elytron has ten, on the anterior disc with nine, rows of punctures, the seventh and eighth rows abbreviated posteriorly, the second, fourth, and sixth interspaces (the last at base and apex) strongly costate, the eighth less strongly elevated, its apex cristate, serrulate. The third costa arises from the apex of the humeral callus, and runs obliquely downwards to join the second one at the termination of its anterior third, its apical portion is confluent with the cristate apex of the fourth.
