= Baliosus terminatus =

Scientific classification
- Kingdom: Animalia
- Phylum: Arthropoda
- Clade: Pancrustacea
- Class: Insecta
- Order: Coleoptera
- Suborder: Polyphaga
- Infraorder: Cucujiformia
- Family: Chrysomelidae
- Genus: Baliosus
- Species: B. terminatus

Binomial name
- Baliosus terminatus (Chapuis, 1877)

Synonyms
- Uroplata (Uroplata) terminata Chapuis, 1877

Species of beetle

Baliosus terminatus is a species of beetle of the family Chrysomelidae. It is found in Brazil (São Paulo).
