= Uroplata subluteofasciata =

Scientific classification
- Kingdom: Animalia
- Phylum: Arthropoda
- Clade: Pancrustacea
- Class: Insecta
- Order: Coleoptera
- Suborder: Polyphaga
- Infraorder: Cucujiformia
- Family: Chrysomelidae
- Genus: Uroplata
- Species: U. subluteofasciata

Binomial name
- Uroplata subluteofasciata Pic, 1927

Species of beetle

Uroplata subluteofasciata is a species of beetle of the family Chrysomelidae. It is found in Brazil (Goiás).

== Description ==
Adults reach a length of about 4 mm. Adults are red, while the thorax is chestnut brown. The elytra are reddish-chestnut, testaceous in the middle and at the apex.

== Biology ==
The food plant is unknown.
