= Uroplata strandi =

Scientific classification
- Kingdom: Animalia
- Phylum: Arthropoda
- Clade: Pancrustacea
- Class: Insecta
- Order: Coleoptera
- Suborder: Polyphaga
- Infraorder: Cucujiformia
- Family: Chrysomelidae
- Genus: Uroplata
- Species: U. strandi

Binomial name
- Uroplata strandi Uhmann, 1937

Species of beetle

Uroplata strandi is a species of beetle of the family Chrysomelidae. It is found in Bolivia and Peru.

== Biology ==
The food plant is unknown.
