= Uroplata minuscula =

Scientific classification
- Kingdom: Animalia
- Phylum: Arthropoda
- Class: Insecta
- Order: Coleoptera
- Suborder: Polyphaga
- Infraorder: Cucujiformia
- Family: Chrysomelidae
- Genus: Uroplata
- Species: U. minuscula

Binomial name
- Uroplata minuscula Chapuis, 1877

Synonyms
- Uroplata subdilatata Pic, 1927

Species of beetle

Uroplata minuscula is a species of beetle of the family Chrysomelidae. It is found in Argentina, Brazil (Rio Grande do Sul), Paraguay and Uruguay.

== Biology ==
The food plant is unknown.
