= Baliosus ferrugineus =

Scientific classification
- Kingdom: Animalia
- Phylum: Arthropoda
- Clade: Pancrustacea
- Class: Insecta
- Order: Coleoptera
- Suborder: Polyphaga
- Infraorder: Cucujiformia
- Family: Chrysomelidae
- Genus: Baliosus
- Species: B. ferrugineus

Binomial name
- Baliosus ferrugineus Staines, 2006

Species of beetle

Baliosus ferrugineus is a species of leaf beetle in the family Chrysomelidae. It is found in North America, where it has been recorded from Arizona.
