= Uroplata jucunda =

Scientific classification
- Kingdom: Animalia
- Phylum: Arthropoda
- Class: Insecta
- Order: Coleoptera
- Suborder: Polyphaga
- Infraorder: Cucujiformia
- Family: Chrysomelidae
- Genus: Uroplata
- Species: U. jucunda

Binomial name
- Uroplata jucunda Chapuis, 1877

Species of beetle

Uroplata jucunda is a species of beetle of the family Chrysomelidae. It is found in Argentina.

== Biology ==
The recorded food plant is Vernonia mollissima.
