= Uroplata reducta =

Scientific classification
- Kingdom: Animalia
- Phylum: Arthropoda
- Class: Insecta
- Order: Coleoptera
- Suborder: Polyphaga
- Infraorder: Cucujiformia
- Family: Chrysomelidae
- Genus: Uroplata
- Species: U. reducta

Binomial name
- Uroplata reducta Monrós & Viana, 1947

Synonyms
- Uroplata (Codiohispa) reducta Monrós & Viana, 1947

Species of beetle

Uroplata reducta is a species of beetle of the family Chrysomelidae. It is found in Argentina.

== Biology ==
The food plant is unknown.
