= Uroplata severini =

Scientific classification
- Kingdom: Animalia
- Phylum: Arthropoda
- Clade: Pancrustacea
- Class: Insecta
- Order: Coleoptera
- Suborder: Polyphaga
- Infraorder: Cucujiformia
- Family: Chrysomelidae
- Genus: Uroplata
- Species: U. severini

Binomial name
- Uroplata severini Weise, 1911

Species of beetle

Uroplata severini is a species of beetle of the family Chrysomelidae. It is found in Brazil (Amazonas) and French Guiana.

== Biology ==
The food plant is unknown.
