= Uroplata lantanae =

Scientific classification
- Kingdom: Animalia
- Phylum: Arthropoda
- Class: Insecta
- Order: Coleoptera
- Suborder: Polyphaga
- Infraorder: Cucujiformia
- Family: Chrysomelidae
- Genus: Uroplata
- Species: U. lantanae

Binomial name
- Uroplata lantanae Buzzi & Winder, 1981

Species of beetle

Uroplata lantanae is a species of beetle of the family Chrysomelidae. It is native to Brazil (Paraná), but has been introduced to Australia and South Africa, as a biological control agent.

== Biology ==
The recorded food plants are Lantana camara and Lantana tiliaefolia. Adults have been observed feeding by rasping leaves, while the larvae mine the leaves of their host plant.
