= Baliosus lycoides =

Scientific classification
- Kingdom: Animalia
- Phylum: Arthropoda
- Clade: Pancrustacea
- Class: Insecta
- Order: Coleoptera
- Suborder: Polyphaga
- Infraorder: Cucujiformia
- Family: Chrysomelidae
- Genus: Baliosus
- Species: B. lycoides

Binomial name
- Baliosus lycoides (Chapuis, 1877)

Synonyms
- Odontota lycoides Chapuis, 1877

Species of beetle

Baliosus lycoides is a species of beetle of the family Chrysomelidae. It is found in Brazil (Amazonas) and French Guiana.
