= Baliosus subdilatatus =

Scientific classification
- Kingdom: Animalia
- Phylum: Arthropoda
- Clade: Pancrustacea
- Class: Insecta
- Order: Coleoptera
- Suborder: Polyphaga
- Infraorder: Cucujiformia
- Family: Chrysomelidae
- Genus: Baliosus
- Species: B. subdilatatus

Binomial name
- Baliosus subdilatatus Pic, 1932

Species of beetle

Baliosus subdilatatus is a species of beetle of the family Chrysomelidae. It is found in Bolivia.
