= Baliosus incisus =

Scientific classification
- Kingdom: Animalia
- Phylum: Arthropoda
- Clade: Pancrustacea
- Class: Insecta
- Order: Coleoptera
- Suborder: Polyphaga
- Infraorder: Cucujiformia
- Family: Chrysomelidae
- Genus: Baliosus
- Species: B. incisus

Binomial name
- Baliosus incisus Pic, 1931

Synonyms
- Baliosus incisus insignata Pic, 1931; Baliosus gamblei Papp, 1953

Species of beetle

Baliosus incisus is a species of beetle of the family Chrysomelidae. It is found in Brazil and French Guiana.
