= Uroplata pascoei =

Scientific classification
- Kingdom: Animalia
- Phylum: Arthropoda
- Class: Insecta
- Order: Coleoptera
- Suborder: Polyphaga
- Infraorder: Cucujiformia
- Family: Chrysomelidae
- Genus: Uroplata
- Species: U. pascoei

Binomial name
- Uroplata pascoei Baly, 1885

Species of beetle

Uroplata pascoei is a species of beetle of the family Chrysomelidae. It is found in Costa Rica, Guatemala, Nicaragua and Panama.

== Description ==
The vertex is smooth and impunctate, the front moderately produced between the eyes, its upper portion coarsely but not deeply punctured, the medial line with a fine longitudinal groove. The antennae are about more than half the length of the body and filiform. The thorax is slightly broader than long at the base, the sides obtusely angulate, converging from the base to the apex, the anterior angle armed with a short, oblique, obtuse tooth. The upper surface is subcylindrical at the sides and apex, broadly depressed and slightly excavated on the hinder disc, closely foveolate-punctate. The scutellum is subquadrate, dilated at the apex, its apical margin notched. The elytra are parallel, rounded at the apex, very slightly dilated towards the posterior angle, the sides finely serrulate. The apical margin is armed with a few strong irregular flattened teeth, sometimes confluent at the base. Each elytron at the extreme base with eleven, the rest of the surface with ten, rows of large punctures, the interspaces not costate.

== Biology ==
The food plant is unknown.
