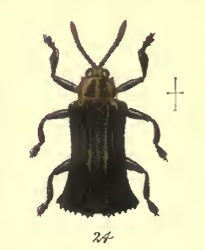

Scientific classification
- Kingdom: Animalia
- Phylum: Arthropoda
- Class: Insecta
- Order: Coleoptera
- Suborder: Polyphaga
- Infraorder: Cucujiformia
- Family: Chrysomelidae
- Genus: Uroplata
- Species: U. fusca

Binomial name
- Uroplata fusca Chapuis, 1877

Synonyms
- Uroplata curvatipes Pic, 1932; Uroplata melancholica Baly, 1885

= Uroplata fusca =

Species of beetle

Uroplata fusca is a species of beetle of the family Chrysomelidae. It is found in Mexico (Querétaro), Belize, Brazil, Costa Rica, El Salvador, Guyana and Nicaragua.

== Description ==
The head is very finely granulose, the front only slightly produced between the eyes. The antennae are gradually thickened towards the apex, rather longer than the head and thorax, robust in the male, but rather more slender in the female. The thorax is transverse, the sides straight and nearly parallel from the base to the middle, sometimes slightly sinuate, then rotundate-angustate to the apex, the anterior angle armed with a strong obtuse tooth. The disc is transversely convex on the sides and apex, broadly depressed and excavated on its hinder surface, coarsely and strongly foveolate-punctate, the punctures scattered on the anterior disc, more crowded behind the middle. The elytra are oblong, the sides nearly parallel before the middle, then gradually dilated to the posterior angle, finely serrulate, the posterior angle abruptly produced into a flattened subtriangular obtuse plate. The apices are obtusely truncate, the margins, together with the hinder edge of the lateral plate, coarsely serrate. The upper surface is opaque and finely granulose. Each elytron has, at its extreme base eleven, at the extreme apex six or seven, and on the rest of its surface ten, rows of punctures, the second and fourth interspaces strongly costate, laterally sinuate, the inner costa obsolete at its base. The basal portion of the sixth, and the entire eighth interspace, moderately elevated.

== Biology ==
The recorded food plants are Pithecactenium echinatum, Malpighia glabra and Arrabidaea mollisima.
