= Hispa stygia =

Scientific classification
- Kingdom: Animalia
- Phylum: Arthropoda
- Clade: Pancrustacea
- Class: Insecta
- Order: Coleoptera
- Suborder: Polyphaga
- Infraorder: Cucujiformia
- Family: Chrysomelidae
- Genus: Hispa
- Species: H. stygia

Binomial name
- Hispa stygia Chapuis, 1877

Synonyms
- Hispa (Hispella) stygia Chapuis, 1877

Species of beetle

Hispa stygia is a species of beetle of the family Chrysomelidae. It is found in India (Madhya Pradesh, Maharashtra, Tamil Nadu, West Bengal).

== Life history ==
The recorded host plants for this species are Oryza sativa, Panicum maximum, Panicum antidotale, Polytoca barbata, Dichanthium annulatum, Dichanthium caricosum, Ischaemum pilosum, Coix lachrma, Sorghum and Themeda species.
