= Baliosus duodecimmaculatus =

Scientific classification
- Kingdom: Animalia
- Phylum: Arthropoda
- Clade: Pancrustacea
- Class: Insecta
- Order: Coleoptera
- Suborder: Polyphaga
- Infraorder: Cucujiformia
- Family: Chrysomelidae
- Genus: Baliosus
- Species: B. duodecimmaculatus

Binomial name
- Baliosus duodecimmaculatus (Baly, 1865)

Synonyms
- Uroplata duodecimmaculatus Baly, 1864; Uroplata multifasciata Pic, 1933

Species of beetle

Baliosus duodecimmaculatus is a species of beetle of the family Chrysomelidae. It is found in Brazil (Minas Gerais).
