= Uroplata compressicornis =

Scientific classification
- Kingdom: Animalia
- Phylum: Arthropoda
- Class: Insecta
- Order: Coleoptera
- Suborder: Polyphaga
- Infraorder: Cucujiformia
- Family: Chrysomelidae
- Genus: Uroplata
- Species: U. compressicornis

Binomial name
- Uroplata compressicornis (Fabricius, 1801)

Synonyms
- Hispa compressicornis Fabricius, 1801; Uroplata cruralis Uhmann, 1940

Species of beetle

Uroplata compressicornis is a species of beetle of the family Chrysomelidae. It is found in French Guiana.

== Biology ==
The food plant is unknown.
