= Uroplata pusilla =

Scientific classification
- Kingdom: Animalia
- Phylum: Arthropoda
- Class: Insecta
- Order: Coleoptera
- Suborder: Polyphaga
- Infraorder: Cucujiformia
- Family: Chrysomelidae
- Genus: Uroplata
- Species: U. pusilla

Binomial name
- Uroplata pusilla Weise, 1905

Species of beetle

Uroplata pusilla is a species of beetle of the family Chrysomelidae. It is found in Brazil and Peru.

== Biology ==
The food plant is unknown.
