= Uroplata forsteri =

Scientific classification
- Kingdom: Animalia
- Phylum: Arthropoda
- Class: Insecta
- Order: Coleoptera
- Suborder: Polyphaga
- Infraorder: Cucujiformia
- Family: Chrysomelidae
- Genus: Uroplata
- Species: U. forsteri

Binomial name
- Uroplata forsteri Uhmann, 1949

Species of beetle

Uroplata forsteri is a species of beetle of the family Chrysomelidae. It is found in Honduras and Mexico (Colima).

== Biology ==
The food plant is unknown.
