= Hispa tarsata =

Scientific classification
- Kingdom: Animalia
- Phylum: Arthropoda
- Clade: Pancrustacea
- Class: Insecta
- Order: Coleoptera
- Suborder: Polyphaga
- Infraorder: Cucujiformia
- Family: Chrysomelidae
- Genus: Hispa
- Species: H. tarsata

Binomial name
- Hispa tarsata Swietojanska, 2001

Species of beetle

Hispa tarsata is a species of beetle of the family Chrysomelidae. It is found in Iran.

== Life history ==
No host plant has been documented for this species.
