= Baliosus rubiginosus =

Scientific classification
- Kingdom: Animalia
- Phylum: Arthropoda
- Clade: Pancrustacea
- Class: Insecta
- Order: Coleoptera
- Suborder: Polyphaga
- Infraorder: Cucujiformia
- Family: Chrysomelidae
- Genus: Baliosus
- Species: B. rubiginosus

Binomial name
- Baliosus rubiginosus (Guérin-Méneville, 1844)

Synonyms
- Uroplata rubiginosa Guérin-Méneville, 1844; Baliosus rubiginosus lateralis Weise, 1912

Species of beetle

Baliosus rubiginosus is a species of beetle of the family Chrysomelidae. It is found in Argentina, Bolivia, Brazil (Goyaz, Matto Grosso, São Paulo), Paraguay and Venezuela.

== Biology ==
This species has been found feeding on Lippa candicans and Lippia species.
