= Baliosus pectoralis =

Scientific classification
- Kingdom: Animalia
- Phylum: Arthropoda
- Clade: Pancrustacea
- Class: Insecta
- Order: Coleoptera
- Suborder: Polyphaga
- Infraorder: Cucujiformia
- Family: Chrysomelidae
- Genus: Baliosus
- Species: B. pectoralis

Binomial name
- Baliosus pectoralis (Baly, 1864)

Synonyms
- Uroplata pectoralis Baly, 1864

Species of beetle

Baliosus pectoralis is a species of beetle of the family Chrysomelidae. It is found in Brazil (São Paulo).

== Description ==
The head is moderately produced between the eyes and the vertex is smooth with a longitudinal groove. The antennae are equal in length to the head and thorax. The thorax is nearly twice as broad at the base as long, with the sides narrowly margined, crenulate, nearly straight at the base, narrowed and rounded in front. The upper surface is transversely impressed on the hinder disk, transversely excavated on the basal lobe, the latter broadly truncate, stained on either side with a piceous spot. The middle of the disk in front is nearly impunctate, finely strigose, the sides coarsely and deeply rugose-punctate. The scutellum is large and triangular. The elytra are much broader at their base than the thorax. The humeral callus is thickened, not raised above the surface of the elytra, but produced horizontally, it is subacute, not extending beyond the lateral border.
