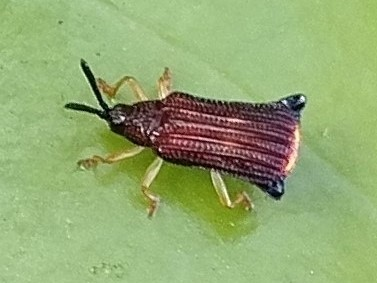

Scientific classification
- Kingdom: Animalia
- Phylum: Arthropoda
- Clade: Pancrustacea
- Class: Insecta
- Order: Coleoptera
- Suborder: Polyphaga
- Infraorder: Cucujiformia
- Family: Chrysomelidae
- Genus: Baliosus
- Species: B. hospes

Binomial name
- Baliosus hospes Weise, 1905

= Baliosus hospes =

Species of beetle

Baliosus hospes is a species of beetle in the family Chrysomelidae. It is found in Bolivia, Brazil (São Paulo) and Paraguay.
