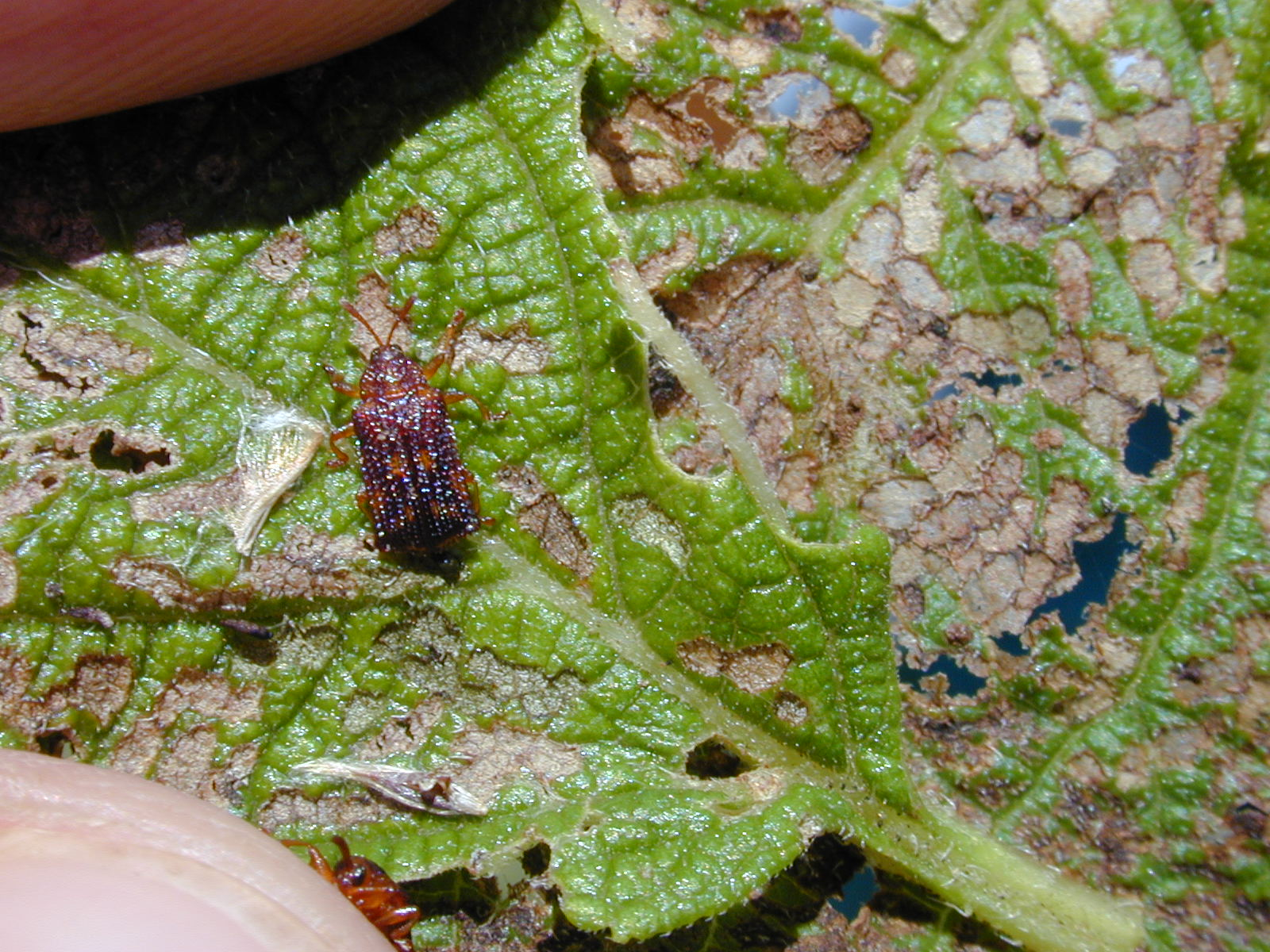

Scientific classification
- Kingdom: Animalia
- Phylum: Arthropoda
- Clade: Pancrustacea
- Class: Insecta
- Order: Coleoptera
- Suborder: Polyphaga
- Infraorder: Cucujiformia
- Family: Chrysomelidae
- Subfamily: Cassidinae
- Tribe: Chalepini
- Genus: Uroplata; Chevrolat, 1836

Synonyms
- Codiohispa Maulik, 1930; Mimuroplata Pic, 1933; Uroplata (Plicatopalpa) Pic, 1932

= Uroplata =

Genus of leaf beetles

Uroplata is a genus of beetles belonging to the family Chrysomelidae; species are distributed mostly in the southern hemisphere: in S. America, Africa, Asia and Australia.

== Species ==
- Uroplata acuta Uhmann, 1968
- Uroplata aeneicollis Weise, 1911
- Uroplata amazona Weise, 1911
- Uroplata ambigua Chapuis, 1877
- Uroplata andicola Weise, 1911
- Uroplata angulata (Fabricius, 1787)
- Uroplata approximata Pic, 1931
- Uroplata armata Baly, 1885
- Uroplata atriceps Pic, 1933
- Uroplata atricornis (Pic, 1927)
- Uroplata auriculata Uhmann, 1943
- Uroplata basifemoralis Pic, 1933
- Uroplata bicoloriceps Pic, 1933
- Uroplata bilineata Chapuis, 1877
- Uroplata bipuncticollis Chapuis, 1877
- Uroplata borgmeieri Uhmann, 1937
- Uroplata brevenotata Pic, 1933
- Uroplata calopteroides Weise, 1911
- Uroplata chalepoides Weise, 1911
- Uroplata coarctata Weise, 1921
- Uroplata compressicornis (Fabricius, 1801)
- Uroplata confusa Uhmann, 1959
- Uroplata constricta Weise, 1910
- Uroplata costaricana Pic, 1932
- Uroplata daguerrei (Pic, 1930)
- Uroplata decipiens Uhmann, 1931
- Uroplata denticulata Uhmann, 1938
- Uroplata distinguenda Baly, 1885
- Uroplata dolorosa Baly, 1885
- Uroplata donceeli Pic, 1937
- Uroplata donckieri Pic, 1933
- Uroplata emilii Chapuis, 1877
- Uroplata exigua Uhmann, 1959
- Uroplata fasciata Pic, 1933
- Uroplata ferruginea Weise, 1905
- Uroplata fiebrigi Spaeth, 1937
- Uroplata forsteri Uhmann, 1949
- Uroplata fulvopustulata Baly, 1885
- Uroplata fusca Chapuis, 1877
- Uroplata germaini Pic, 1927
- Uroplata girardi Pic, 1934
- Uroplata holosericea Weise, 1911
- Uroplata humeralis Pic, 1933
- Uroplata iheringi Weise, 1911
- Uroplata inornata Uhmann, 1959
- Uroplata insolitus Uhmann, 1968
- Uroplata insularum Uhmann, 1968
- Uroplata interrupta Weise, 1911
- Uroplata irregularis (Pic, 1932)
- Uroplata jucunda Chapuis, 1877
- Uroplata kuntzoni Uhmann, 1937
- Uroplata lantanae Buzzi & Winder, 1981
- Uroplata lobata Weise, 1911
- Uroplata longipes Weise, 1906
- Uroplata maculicollis Weise, 1905
- Uroplata maura (Fabricius, 1801)
- Uroplata minuscula Chapuis, 1877
- Uroplata monrosi Uhmann, 1959
- Uroplata mucronata (Olivier, 1808)
- Uroplata nebulosa Baly, 1885
- Uroplata nigritarsus Weise, 1921
- Uroplata nupta Weise, 1905
- Uroplata obscurella Weise, 1921
- Uroplata ogloblini Monrós & Viana, 1947
- Uroplata orphanula Weise, 1905
- Uroplata pascoei Baly, 1885
- Uroplata peruana Pic, 1927
- Uroplata planiuscula Chapuis, 1877
- Uroplata pretiosa Baly, 1864
- Uroplata probaeniformis Uhmann, 1937
- Uroplata pusilla Weise, 1905
- Uroplata quadridens Weise, 1921
- Uroplata rectangula Uhmann, 1953
- Uroplata reducta Monrós & Viana, 1947
- Uroplata reimoseri Spaeth, 1937
- Uroplata romani Weise, 1921
- Uroplata rudis Uhmann, 1937
- Uroplata ruficornis Pic, 1933
- Uroplata rufifrons Pic, 1933
- Uroplata sculptilis Chapuis, 1877
- Uroplata serrulata Weise, 1911
- Uroplata severini Weise, 1911
- Uroplata singularis Pic, 1931
- Uroplata spaethi Uhmann, 1940
- Uroplata spinosa Pic, 1932
- Uroplata stevensi Baly, 1864
- Uroplata strandi Uhmann, 1937
- Uroplata subluteofasciata Pic, 1927
- Uroplata sublimbata Chapuis, 1877
- Uroplata submarginalis Baly, 1864
- Uroplata triangula Uhmann, 1951
- Uroplata trivittata Chapuis, 1877
- Uroplata varicostata Pic, 1932
- Uroplata variegata Weise, 1921
- Uroplata vicina Guérin-Méneville, 1844

== Unknown status ==
- Uroplata scitula was described by Spaeth from Brazil (Bahia) and Bondar reported Elephaetopus mollis as its food plant.
