= Baliosus fraternus =

Scientific classification
- Kingdom: Animalia
- Phylum: Arthropoda
- Clade: Pancrustacea
- Class: Insecta
- Order: Coleoptera
- Suborder: Polyphaga
- Infraorder: Cucujiformia
- Family: Chrysomelidae
- Genus: Baliosus
- Species: B. fraternus

Binomial name
- Baliosus fraternus (Baly, 1885)

Synonyms
- Chalepus fraternus Baly, 1885; Chalepus pascoei Baly, 1885

Species of beetle

Baliosus fraternus is a species of beetle of the family Chrysomelidae. It is found in Costa Rica, Guatemala, Mexico and Nicaragua.

== Description ==
The vertex is smooth and impunctate, the interocular space moderately produced and angulate. The antennae are robust, obsoletely thickened towards the apex and rather longer than the head and thorax. The thorax is broader than long, the sides converging from base to apex, subangulate-rutundate. The disc is transversely convex, transversely excavated behind the middle, coarsely and closely punctured. The elytra are broader than the thorax, the sides very slightly dilated, the apices regularly rounded and the outer margin distinctly serrulate. Each elytron at the extreme base and on the hinder disc with ten, on the anterior disc with nine, rows of large, deeply impressed punctures, the second and fourth interspaces rather strongly and equally costate, the eighth interspace less strongly elevated, the sixth interspace thickened at its apex, the suture also thickened.
