= Uroplata maculicollis =

Scientific classification
- Kingdom: Animalia
- Phylum: Arthropoda
- Class: Insecta
- Order: Coleoptera
- Suborder: Polyphaga
- Infraorder: Cucujiformia
- Family: Chrysomelidae
- Genus: Uroplata
- Species: U. maculicollis

Binomial name
- Uroplata maculicollis Weise, 1905

Species of beetle

Uroplata maculicollis is a species of beetle of the family Chrysomelidae. It is found in Argentina, Brazil (Goiás) and Paraguay.

== Biology ==
The food plant is unknown.
