= Uroplata andicola =

Scientific classification
- Kingdom: Animalia
- Phylum: Arthropoda
- Class: Insecta
- Order: Coleoptera
- Suborder: Polyphaga
- Infraorder: Cucujiformia
- Family: Chrysomelidae
- Genus: Uroplata
- Species: U. andicola

Binomial name
- Uroplata andicola Weise, 1911

Species of beetle

Uroplata andicola is a species of beetle of the family Chrysomelidae. It is found in Bolivia and Peru.

== Biology ==
The food plant is unknown.
