= Uroplata serrulata =

Scientific classification
- Kingdom: Animalia
- Phylum: Arthropoda
- Clade: Pancrustacea
- Class: Insecta
- Order: Coleoptera
- Suborder: Polyphaga
- Infraorder: Cucujiformia
- Family: Chrysomelidae
- Genus: Uroplata
- Species: U. serrulata

Binomial name
- Uroplata serrulata Weise, 1911

Synonyms
- Uroplata (Codiohispa) serrulata serratipennis Spaeth, 1937; Mimuroplata irregularis Pic, 1933

Species of beetle

Uroplata serrulata is a species of beetle of the family Chrysomelidae. It is found in Argentina and Paraguay.

== Biology ==
The recorded food plant is Lippa geminata.
