= Baliosus limbiferus =

Scientific classification
- Kingdom: Animalia
- Phylum: Arthropoda
- Clade: Pancrustacea
- Class: Insecta
- Order: Coleoptera
- Suborder: Polyphaga
- Infraorder: Cucujiformia
- Family: Chrysomelidae
- Genus: Baliosus
- Species: B. limbiferus

Binomial name
- Baliosus limbiferus Uhmann, 1939

Species of beetle

Baliosus limbiferus is a species of beetle of the family Chrysomelidae. It is found in Brazil (Bahia).

== Biology ==
This species has been found feeding on Bauhinia species.
