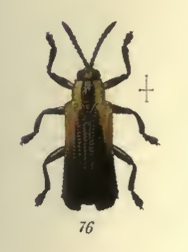

Scientific classification
- Kingdom: Animalia
- Phylum: Arthropoda
- Clade: Pancrustacea
- Class: Insecta
- Order: Coleoptera
- Suborder: Polyphaga
- Infraorder: Cucujiformia
- Family: Chrysomelidae
- Genus: Uroplata
- Species: U. sculptilis

Binomial name
- Uroplata sculptilis Chapuis, 1877

Synonyms
- Uroplata excisa Baly, 1885

= Uroplata sculptilis =

Species of beetle

Uroplata sculptilis is a species of beetle of the family Chrysomelidae. It is found in Costa Rica, Guatemala, Honduras, Mexico (Guerrero, Veracruz), Nicaragua and Panama.

== Description ==
The vertex is smooth and impressed anteriorly with a short longitudinal groove. The interocular space is slightly produced and obtuse. The antennae are less than half the length of the body and slightly dilated towards the apex. The thorax is broader than long, the sides nearly straight, converging from the base to the apex. The upper surface is transversely convex, the hinder disc faintly excavated on either side of the medial line, coarsely and deeply punctured. There is a broad subtorulose vitta on either side near the lateral margin less closely punctured. The elytra are parallel, very slightly dilated at the obsolete hinder angle. The apex is rounded, and the apical margin is dilated, broadly emarginate at the suture. The sides are finely, at the apex rather more strongly, serrulate. Each elytron has ten, at the extreme base with eleven, rows of deep punctures, the second and fourth interspaces, together with the suture, moderately costate, the eighth interspace obsoletely elevated.

== Biology ==
The recorded food plants are Clibadium aspersum, Sidedrella nodiflora, Igna edulis and Gouania adenophora.
