= Baliosus vittaticollis =

Scientific classification
- Kingdom: Animalia
- Phylum: Arthropoda
- Clade: Pancrustacea
- Class: Insecta
- Order: Coleoptera
- Suborder: Polyphaga
- Infraorder: Cucujiformia
- Family: Chrysomelidae
- Genus: Baliosus
- Species: B. vittaticollis

Binomial name
- Baliosus vittaticollis (Baly, 1885)

Synonyms
- Chalepus vittaticollis Baly, 1885

Species of beetle

Baliosus vittaticollis is a species of beetle of the family Chrysomelidae. It is found in Mexico.

== Description ==
The head is smooth, the vertex and front impressed with a longitudinal groove. The antennae are scarcely longer than the head and thorax, thickened towards the apex, and the five outer joints forming a slender ill-defined club. The thorax is transverse, the sides angulate, straight and parallel from the base to the middle, then obliquely converging towards the apex, the anterior angle produced, acute. The upper surface is transversely convex, transversely depressed and excavated on the hinder disc, deeply foveolate-punctate. The lateral margin, together with two discoidal vittae (the latter confluent at the base) are blackish-piceous. The elytra are broader than the thorax, oblong, gradually but slightly dilated from the base towards the apex, the latter obtuse. The outer margin is distinctly but finely serrulate. Each elytron has ten, on the anterior disc with nine, rows of punctures, the second, fourth, sixth (at base and apex), and the eighth interspaces costate. The humeral callus is laterally produced, obtuse.
