= Uroplata germaini =

Scientific classification
- Kingdom: Animalia
- Phylum: Arthropoda
- Class: Insecta
- Order: Coleoptera
- Suborder: Polyphaga
- Infraorder: Cucujiformia
- Family: Chrysomelidae
- Genus: Uroplata
- Species: U. germaini

Binomial name
- Uroplata germaini Pic, 1927

Species of beetle

Uroplata germaini is a species of beetle of the family Chrysomelidae. It is found in Bolivia.

== Description ==
Adults reach a length of about 4 mm. Adults are testaceous, partly red. The head is metallic posteriorly and the thorax is testaceous, with three brown spots. The elytra has ten dotted lines posteriorly.

== Biology ==
The food plant is unknown.
