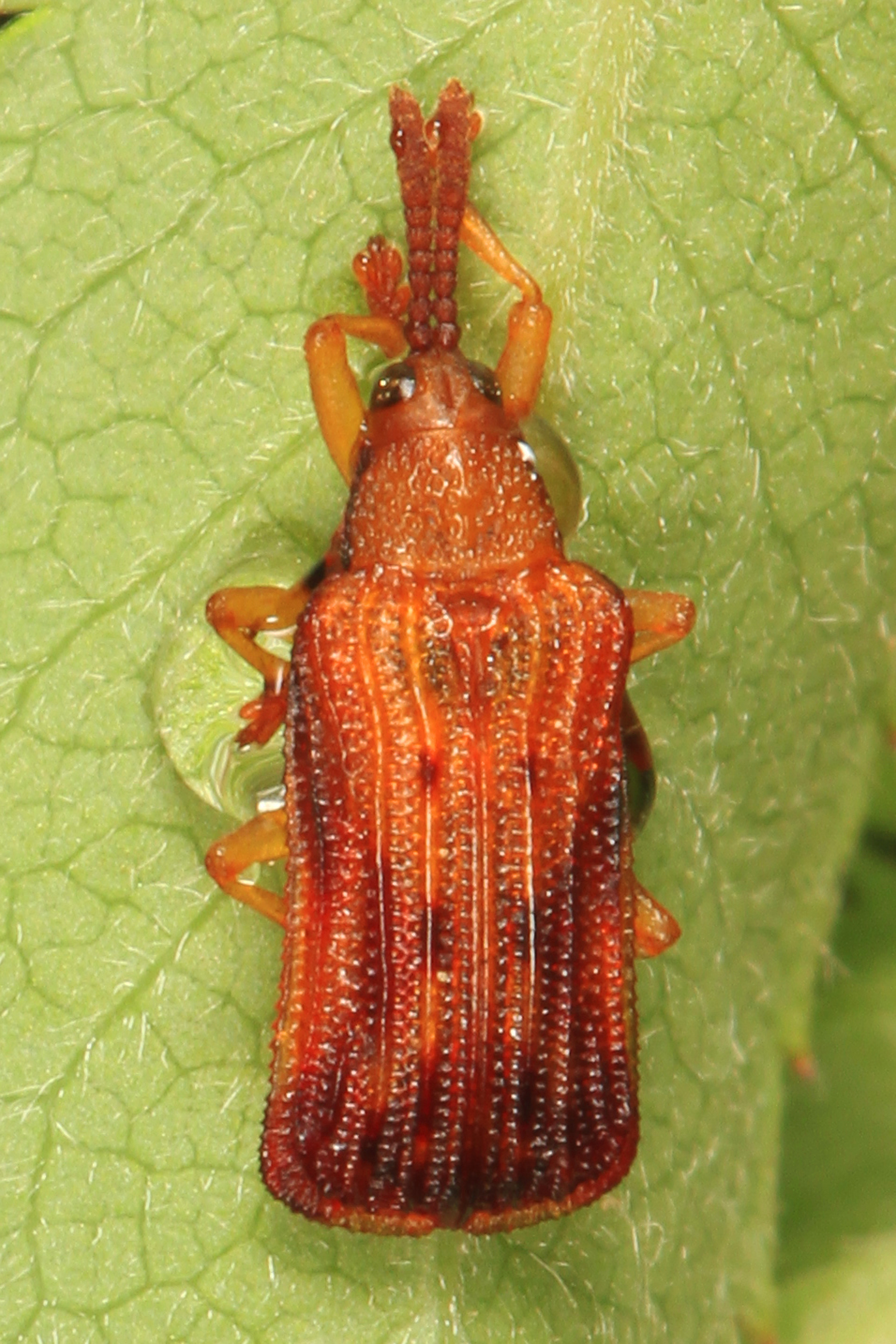
- Baliosus nervosus

Scientific classification
- Kingdom: Animalia
- Phylum: Arthropoda
- Clade: Pancrustacea
- Class: Insecta
- Order: Coleoptera
- Suborder: Polyphaga
- Infraorder: Cucujiformia
- Family: Chrysomelidae
- Tribe: Chalepini
- Genus: Baliosus; Weise, 1905

Synonyms
- Parabaliosus Monrós & Viana, 1947

= Baliosus =

Genus of beetles

Baliosus is a genus of tortoise beetles and hispines in the family Chrysomelidae. There are at least 40 described species in Baliosus.

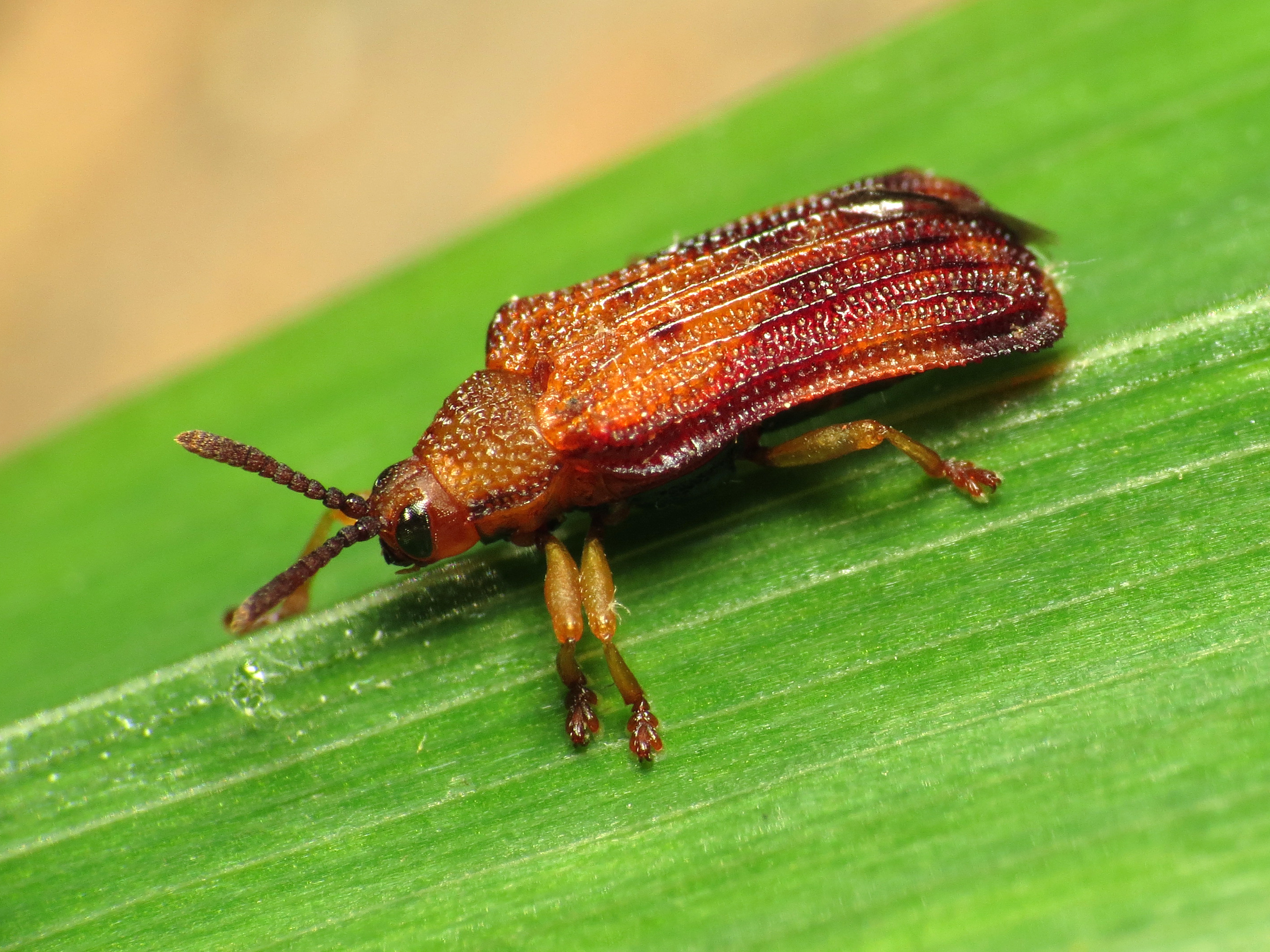
Baliosus nervosus

== Species ==
- Baliosus angulifer Uhmann, 1961
- Baliosus antennatus (Guérin-Méneville in Cuvier, 1844)
- Baliosus baeri Pic, 1932
- Baliosus californicus (Horn, 1883)
- Baliosus conspersus Weise, 1911
- Baliosus dentipes Weise, 1910
- Baliosus donckieri Pic, 1934
- Baliosus duodecimmaculatus (Baly, 1865)
- Baliosus ferrugineus Staines, 2006
- Baliosus fraternus (Baly, 1885)
- Baliosus fraudulentus (Weise, 1921)
- Baliosus germaini Pic, 1932
- Baliosus holtzi Pic, 1934
- Baliosus hospes Weise, 1905
- Baliosus illustris (Weise, 1905)
- Baliosus incertus Pic, 1934
- Baliosus incisus Pic, 1931
- Baliosus indutus Uhmann, 1947
- Baliosus intricatus Weise, 1910
- Baliosus latipennis Pic, 1934
- Baliosus latus Weise, 1921
- Baliosus limbiferus Uhmann, 1939
- Baliosus lineaticollis (Baly, 1886)
- Baliosus lineatus Uhmann, 1940
- Baliosus longicornis Pic, 1932
- Baliosus lycoides (Chapuis, 1877)
- Baliosus marmoratus (Baly, 1885)
- Baliosus nervosus (Panzer, 1794) (basswood leaf miner)
- Baliosus opifer Weise, 1905
- Baliosus parvulus (Chapuis, 1877)
- Baliosus pectoralis (Baly, 1864)
- Baliosus pici Uhmann, 1935
- Baliosus pretiosus (Baly, 1864)
- Baliosus productus (Baly, 1885)
- Baliosus quadrilineatus Pic, 1932
- Baliosus randia Riley, 2015
- Baliosus rubiginosus (Guérin-Méneville in Cuvier, 1844)
- Baliosus schmidti Uhmann, 1935
- Baliosus semitestaceus (Erichson, 1847)
- Baliosus subapicalis (Baly, 1885)
- Baliosus subdilatatus Pic, 1932
- Baliosus subparvulus Uhmann, 1948
- Baliosus terminatus (Chapuis, 1877)
- Baliosus varius Weise, 1911
- Baliosus viridanus (Baly, 1885)
- Baliosus vittaticollis (Baly, 1885)
- Baliosus yacumae Uhmann, 1957
