= Baliosus productus =

Scientific classification
- Kingdom: Animalia
- Phylum: Arthropoda
- Clade: Pancrustacea
- Class: Insecta
- Order: Coleoptera
- Suborder: Polyphaga
- Infraorder: Cucujiformia
- Family: Chrysomelidae
- Genus: Baliosus
- Species: B. productus

Binomial name
- Baliosus productus (Baly, 1885)

Synonyms
- Chalepus productus Baly, 1885

Species of beetle

Baliosus productus is a species of beetle of the family Chrysomelidae. It is found in Guatemala.

== Description ==
The head is smooth and impunctate, the face very slightly produced between the eyes. The antennae are rather longer than the head and thorax and robust. The thorax is transverse, with the sides slightly rounded, nearly straight and parallel from the base to the middle, then slightly rounded and converging towards the apex, the apical angle armed with a short, oblique, subacute tooth. The elytra are much broader than the thorax and oblong, the sides parallel anteriorly, very slightly dilated towards the hinder angle, the latter slightly produced laterally, obtuse. The apex is slightly sinuate on either side near the outer angle and the lateral margin distinctly, the apical one minutely and much less distinctly, serrulate. Each elytron has ten, on the anterior disc with nine, rows of large deep punctures, the second, fourth, sixth (the last broadly interrupted in the middle), together with the eighth interspaces costate, the eighth less strongly elevated than the rest, the suture (its extreme base excepted) also costate.
