= Uroplata coarctata =

Scientific classification
- Kingdom: Animalia
- Phylum: Arthropoda
- Clade: Pancrustacea
- Class: Insecta
- Order: Coleoptera
- Suborder: Polyphaga
- Infraorder: Cucujiformia
- Family: Chrysomelidae
- Genus: Uroplata
- Species: U. coarctata

Binomial name
- Uroplata coarctata Weise, 1921

Synonyms
- Uroplata anonicola Maulik, 1930

Species of beetle

Uroplata coarctata is a species of beetle of the family Chrysomelidae. It is found in Argentina, Brazil (Bahia, Distrito Federal, Mato Grosso, Minas Gerais, Rio de Janeiro, Rio Grande do Sul, Pernambuco, São Paulo) and Paraguay.

== Biology ==
The recorded food plants are Annona squamosa, Rollinia sylvatica and Arrhabidea coleocalyx.
