= Uroplata pretiosa =

Scientific classification
- Kingdom: Animalia
- Phylum: Arthropoda
- Class: Insecta
- Order: Coleoptera
- Suborder: Polyphaga
- Infraorder: Cucujiformia
- Family: Chrysomelidae
- Genus: Uroplata
- Species: U. pretiosa

Binomial name
- Uroplata pretiosa Baly, 1864

Species of beetle

Uroplata pretiosa is a species of beetle of the family Chrysomelidae. It is found in Brazil (Amazonas).

== Biology ==
The food plant is unknown.
