= Baliosus californicus =

Scientific classification
- Kingdom: Animalia
- Phylum: Arthropoda
- Clade: Pancrustacea
- Class: Insecta
- Order: Coleoptera
- Suborder: Polyphaga
- Infraorder: Cucujiformia
- Family: Chrysomelidae
- Genus: Baliosus
- Species: B. californicus

Binomial name
- Baliosus californicus (Horn, 1883)

Synonyms
- Odontota californicus Horn, 1883

Species of beetle

Baliosus californicus is a species of tortoise beetle or hispine in the family Chrysomelidae. It is found in Central America and North America, where it has been recorded from the United States (Arizona, California, Oregon, Texas) and Mexico (Baja California).

== Description ==
The head is smooth and opaque and the face between the eyes is obsoletely produced, the front and upper face impressed with a deep longitudinal groove. The antennae are equal in length to the head and thorax, slightly thickened towards the apex. The thorax is slightly broader than long, the sides converging from the base to the apex, obsoletely angulate. The elytra are oblong, parallel, the apices conjointly, obtusely rounded. The margin is minutely serrulate. The upper surface is convex on the sides and at the apex, slightly flattened along the suture. Each elytron has ten, about the middle disc with nine, at the extreme base with eleven, rows of deeply impressed punctures, the second, fourth, and eighth interspaces (the basal third of the last excepted), together with the sixth at base and apex, costate, the suture also elevated.

== Biology ==
This species has been found feeding on Ceanothus fendleri, Ceanothus integerrimus, Ceanothus leucodermis and Ceanothus velutinus.
