= Baliosus schmidti =

Scientific classification
- Kingdom: Animalia
- Phylum: Arthropoda
- Clade: Pancrustacea
- Class: Insecta
- Order: Coleoptera
- Suborder: Polyphaga
- Infraorder: Cucujiformia
- Family: Chrysomelidae
- Genus: Baliosus
- Species: B. schmidti

Binomial name
- Baliosus schmidti Uhmann, 1935

Species of beetle

Baliosus schmidti is a species of beetle of the family Chrysomelidae. It is found in Bolivia.

== Biology ==
This species has been found feeding on Banisteria argentea, Guaiacum species and Guazuma ulmifolia.
