= Baliosus yacumae =

Scientific classification
- Kingdom: Animalia
- Phylum: Arthropoda
- Clade: Pancrustacea
- Class: Insecta
- Order: Coleoptera
- Suborder: Polyphaga
- Infraorder: Cucujiformia
- Family: Chrysomelidae
- Genus: Baliosus
- Species: B. yacumae

Binomial name
- Baliosus yacumae Uhmann, 1957

Species of beetle

Baliosus yacumae is a species of beetle of the family Chrysomelidae. It is found in Bolivia.
