= Uroplata bipuncticollis =

Scientific classification
- Kingdom: Animalia
- Phylum: Arthropoda
- Class: Insecta
- Order: Coleoptera
- Suborder: Polyphaga
- Infraorder: Cucujiformia
- Family: Chrysomelidae
- Genus: Uroplata
- Species: U. bipuncticollis

Binomial name
- Uroplata bipuncticollis Chapuis, 1877

Synonyms
- Uroplata maculata Weise, 1905

Species of beetle

Uroplata bipuncticollis is a species of beetle of the family Chrysomelidae. It is found in Argentina and Brazil.

== Biology ==
The recorded food plant is Aristolochia fimbriata.
