= Hispa brachycera =

Scientific classification
- Kingdom: Animalia
- Phylum: Arthropoda
- Clade: Pancrustacea
- Class: Insecta
- Order: Coleoptera
- Suborder: Polyphaga
- Infraorder: Cucujiformia
- Family: Chrysomelidae
- Genus: Hispa
- Species: H. brachycera

Binomial name
- Hispa brachycera (Gestro, 1897)

Synonyms
- Hispella brachycera Gestro, 1897

Species of beetle

Hispa brachycera is a species of beetle of the family Chrysomelidae. It is found in India (Andhra Pradesh, Bihar, Himachal Pradesh, Maharashtra, Meghalaya, Orissa, Punjab, Tamil Nadu) and Pakistan.

== Life history ==
The recorded host plants for this species are grasses (Poaceae) and Lantana camara .
