= Uroplata denticulata =

Scientific classification
- Kingdom: Animalia
- Phylum: Arthropoda
- Class: Insecta
- Order: Coleoptera
- Suborder: Polyphaga
- Infraorder: Cucujiformia
- Family: Chrysomelidae
- Genus: Uroplata
- Species: U. denticulata

Binomial name
- Uroplata denticulata Uhmann, 1938

Species of beetle

Uroplata denticulata is a species of beetle of the family Chrysomelidae. It is found in Brazil (Bahia).

== Biology ==
The recorded food plant is Ocotea opifera.
