= Baliosus semitestaceus =

Scientific classification
- Kingdom: Animalia
- Phylum: Arthropoda
- Clade: Pancrustacea
- Class: Insecta
- Order: Coleoptera
- Suborder: Polyphaga
- Infraorder: Cucujiformia
- Family: Chrysomelidae
- Genus: Baliosus
- Species: B. semitestaceus

Binomial name
- Baliosus semitestaceus (Erichson, 1847)

Synonyms
- Anoplitis (Microdonta) semitestaceus Erichson, 1847

Species of beetle

Baliosus semitestaceus is a species of beetle of the family Chrysomelidae. It is found in Peru.
