= Baliosus varius =

Scientific classification
- Kingdom: Animalia
- Phylum: Arthropoda
- Clade: Pancrustacea
- Class: Insecta
- Order: Coleoptera
- Suborder: Polyphaga
- Infraorder: Cucujiformia
- Family: Chrysomelidae
- Genus: Baliosus
- Species: B. varius

Binomial name
- Baliosus varius Weise, 1911

Species of beetle

Baliosus varius is a species of beetle of the family Chrysomelidae. It is found in Brazil (Matto Grosso, São Paulo).
