= Hispa ramosa =

Scientific classification
- Kingdom: Animalia
- Phylum: Arthropoda
- Clade: Pancrustacea
- Class: Insecta
- Order: Coleoptera
- Suborder: Polyphaga
- Infraorder: Cucujiformia
- Family: Chrysomelidae
- Genus: Hispa
- Species: H. ramosa

Binomial name
- Hispa ramosa Gyllenhal, 1817

Synonyms
- Hispella andrewesi Weise, 1897; Hispella donckieri Pic, 1924; Hispa ceylonica Motschulsky, 1861; Hispa echinata Chen & Sun, 1964; Hispa andrewsei singhalensis Maulik, 1919

Species of beetle

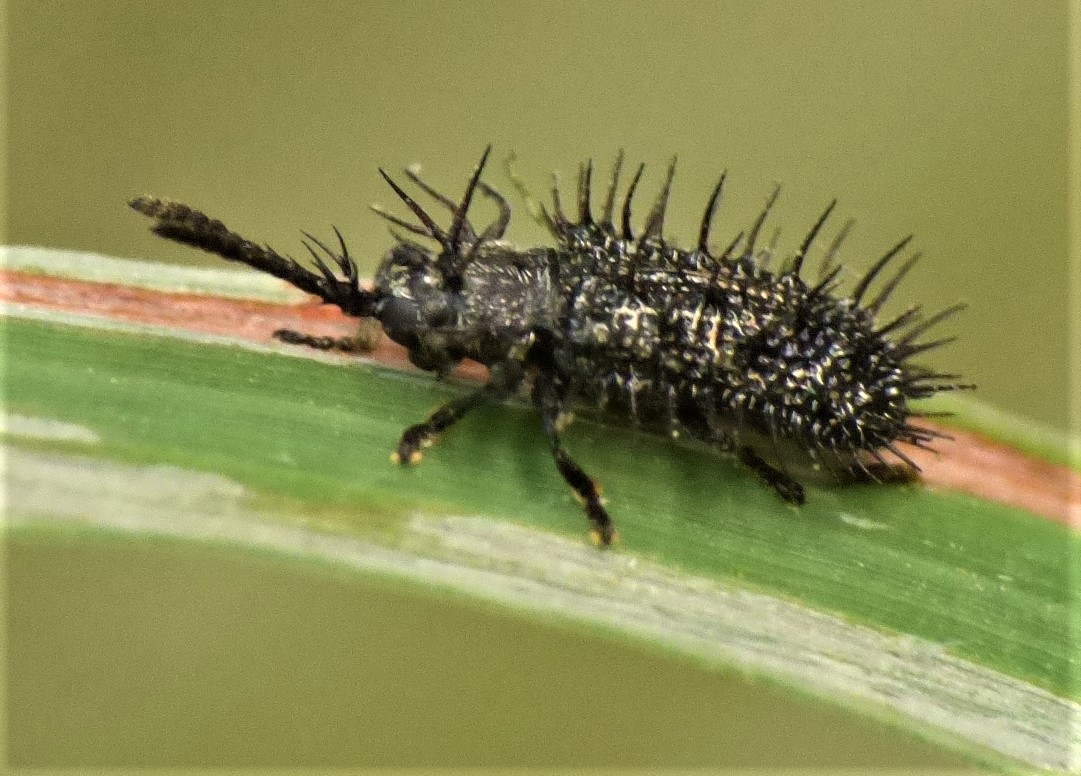
Hispa ramosa, Udaipur

Hispa ramosa, is a species of leaf beetle native to India (Bihar, Karnataka, Madhya Pradesh, Orissa, Punjab, Tamil Nadu, Uttar Pradesh, West Bengal), Nepal, Sri Lanka, Afghanistan, China (Anhui, Hainan, Guangxi, Guangdong, Xikang, Yunnan), Indonesia (Java), Laos, Myanmar and Thailand. Vietnam.

== Description ==
The species contains black pronotum and elytra.

== Life history ==
The recorded host plants for this species are Cholum, Sorghum and Centotheca species, as well as Imperata cylindrica major.
