= Uroplata constricta =

Scientific classification
- Kingdom: Animalia
- Phylum: Arthropoda
- Class: Insecta
- Order: Coleoptera
- Suborder: Polyphaga
- Infraorder: Cucujiformia
- Family: Chrysomelidae
- Genus: Uroplata
- Species: U. constricta

Binomial name
- Uroplata constricta Weise, 1910

Species of beetle

Uroplata constricta is a species of beetle of the family Chrysomelidae. It is found in Colombia.

== Biology ==
The food plant is unknown.
