= Baliosus indutus =

Scientific classification
- Kingdom: Animalia
- Phylum: Arthropoda
- Clade: Pancrustacea
- Class: Insecta
- Order: Coleoptera
- Suborder: Polyphaga
- Infraorder: Cucujiformia
- Family: Chrysomelidae
- Genus: Baliosus
- Species: B. indutus

Binomial name
- Baliosus indutus Uhmann, 1947

Synonyms
- Parabaliosus ogloblini Monrós & Viana, 1947

Species of beetle

Baliosus indutus is a species of beetle of the family Chrysomelidae. It is found in Argentina, Brazil and Paraguay.

== Description ==
Adults reach a length of about 5.5 mm. They have are reddish with a blue-metallic sheen. The antennae are black and the legs are yellow.
