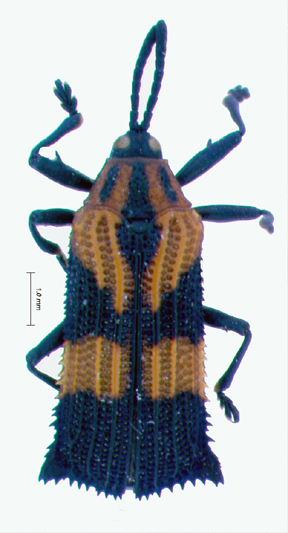

Scientific classification
- Kingdom: Animalia
- Phylum: Arthropoda
- Class: Insecta
- Order: Coleoptera
- Suborder: Polyphaga
- Infraorder: Cucujiformia
- Family: Chrysomelidae
- Genus: Uroplata
- Species: U. mucronata

Binomial name
- Uroplata mucronata (Olivier, 1808)

Synonyms
- Hispa mucronata Olivier, 1808

= Uroplata mucronata =

Species of beetle

Uroplata mucronata is a species of beetle of the family Chrysomelidae. It is found in Brazil (Bahia) and French Guiana.

== Biology ==
The recorded food plants are Rolandra argentea and Wedelia paludosa.
