= Uroplata bilineata =

Scientific classification
- Kingdom: Animalia
- Phylum: Arthropoda
- Class: Insecta
- Order: Coleoptera
- Suborder: Polyphaga
- Infraorder: Cucujiformia
- Family: Chrysomelidae
- Genus: Uroplata
- Species: U. bilineata

Binomial name
- Uroplata bilineata Chapuis, 1877

Species of beetle

Uroplata bilineata is a species of beetle of the family Chrysomelidae. It is found in Argentina, Bolivia, Brazil and Paraguay.

== Biology ==
The recorded food plants are Lantana camara, Lippa urticoides, Verbena trifida, Caesaria sellowii and Bignonia unguiscati.
