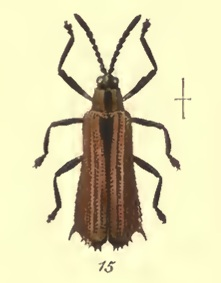

Scientific classification
- Kingdom: Animalia
- Phylum: Arthropoda
- Class: Insecta
- Order: Coleoptera
- Suborder: Polyphaga
- Infraorder: Cucujiformia
- Family: Chrysomelidae
- Genus: Uroplata
- Species: U. armata

Binomial name
- Uroplata armata Baly, 1885

= Uroplata armata =

Species of beetle

Uroplata armata is a species of beetle of the family Chrysomelidae. It is found in Panama.

== Description ==
The vertex and front are subopaque and the interocular space is moderately produced. The antennae are half the length of the body. The thorax is broader than long, the sides obliquely converging from base to apex, subangulate. The upper surface is convex, transversely excavated on the hinder disc, closely and coarsely punctured. The elytra are subelongate, parallel before, slightly dilated behind, the middle lateral margin in front obsoletely, behind the middle more distinctly, serrulate. The hinder angle is armed with a strong acute oblique spine and the apical margin is rounded, subquadrate-emarginate at the sutural angle, its outer half obsoletely, the inner half irregularly, serrulate. Each elytron has ten, at the extreme base with eleven, rows of punctures, the alternate interspaces costate, the second and fourth rather more strongly elevated.

== Biology ==
The food plant is unknown.
