= Baliosus incertus =

Scientific classification
- Kingdom: Animalia
- Phylum: Arthropoda
- Clade: Pancrustacea
- Class: Insecta
- Order: Coleoptera
- Suborder: Polyphaga
- Infraorder: Cucujiformia
- Family: Chrysomelidae
- Genus: Baliosus
- Species: B. incertus

Binomial name
- Baliosus incertus Pic, 1934

Species of beetle

Baliosus incertus is a species of beetle of the family Chrysomelidae. It is found in Costa Rica.
