= Uroplata dolorosa =

Scientific classification
- Kingdom: Animalia
- Phylum: Arthropoda
- Clade: Pancrustacea
- Class: Insecta
- Order: Coleoptera
- Suborder: Polyphaga
- Infraorder: Cucujiformia
- Family: Chrysomelidae
- Genus: Uroplata
- Species: U. dolorosa

Binomial name
- Uroplata dolorosa Baly, 1885

Species of beetle

Uroplata dolorosa is a species of beetle of the family Chrysomelidae. It is found in Panama.

== Description ==
The vertex and front are opaque, the former impressed with an ill-defined fovea. The interocular space is moderately produced and obtuse. The antennae are less than one third the length of the body and thickened towards the apex. The thorax is transverse, the sides straight and parallel from the base to the middle, then rounded and converging towards the apex, sinuate anteriorly, the apical angle armed with a strong subacute tooth. The disc is coarsely punctured, a narrow medial line, and the space immediately behind the apical margin, free from punctures. The elytra are subparallel before the middle, then gradually dilated towards the posterior angle, the latter laterally produced, the apex obtusely rounded. The lateral margin is very finely, the apical one coarsely and irregularly, serrulate. Each elytron has ten, at the extreme base with eleven, rows of punctures, the second and fourth interspaces strongly costate, subsinuate, the eighth interspace very slightly thickened. The humeral callus is laterally produced, its apex obtuse.

== Biology ==
The food plant is unknown.
