= Baliosus viridanus =

Scientific classification
- Kingdom: Animalia
- Phylum: Arthropoda
- Clade: Pancrustacea
- Class: Insecta
- Order: Coleoptera
- Suborder: Polyphaga
- Infraorder: Cucujiformia
- Family: Chrysomelidae
- Genus: Baliosus
- Species: B. viridanus

Binomial name
- Baliosus viridanus (Baly, 1885)

Synonyms
- Chalepus viridanus Baly, 1885

Species of beetle

Baliosus viridanus is a species of beetle of the family Chrysomelidae. It is found in Argentina, Bolivia, Brazil (Bahia, Paraná, Pernambuco), Costa Rica, Panama and Paraguay.

== Description ==
The interocular space is very slightly produced, the vertex and front smooth and impunctate, obtuse, fulvous and the sides of the neck blackish-piceous. The antennae are longer than the head and thorax, thickened towards the apex. The thorax is transverse, the sides straight and parallel, converging at the extreme apex, the anterior angle armed with an obtuse tooth. The disc is transversely convex, transversely depressed behind the middle, closely and coarsely punctured, outer limb narrowly edged with piceo-fulvous. The elytra are oblong, increasing in width from the base towards the apex, the latter obtusely rounded. The lateral margin is finely, the apical one more strongly, serrulate. Each elytron at the base and apex with ten, the middle disc with nine, rows of punctures, the second, fourth, sixth (at base and apex), and eighth interspaces moderately costate and green, the basal limb narrowly, the outer one broadly, flavous, the latter with some irregular markings together with a narrow subapical fascia, black.

== Biology ==
This species has been found feeding on Basanacantha spinosa.
