= Baliosus randia =

Scientific classification
- Kingdom: Animalia
- Phylum: Arthropoda
- Clade: Pancrustacea
- Class: Insecta
- Order: Coleoptera
- Suborder: Polyphaga
- Infraorder: Cucujiformia
- Family: Chrysomelidae
- Genus: Baliosus
- Species: B. randia

Binomial name
- Baliosus randia Riley, 2015

Species of beetle

Baliosus randia is a species of beetle of the family Chrysomelidae. It is found in southern Texas.

== Description ==
Adults reach a length of about 2.9–3.4 mm.

== Biology ==
This species has been collected on Randia rhagocarpa.
