= Uroplata obscurella =

Scientific classification
- Kingdom: Animalia
- Phylum: Arthropoda
- Class: Insecta
- Order: Coleoptera
- Suborder: Polyphaga
- Infraorder: Cucujiformia
- Family: Chrysomelidae
- Genus: Uroplata
- Species: U. obscurella

Binomial name
- Uroplata obscurella Weise, 1921

Synonyms
- Uroplata incisipennis Pic, 1933; Uroplata incisipennis bilineatithorax Pic, 1933; Uroplata incisipennis latefasciata Pic, 1933; Uroplata incisipennis obliteratithorax Pic, 1933

Species of beetle

Uroplata obscurella is a species of beetle of the family Chrysomelidae. It is found in Bolivia, Brazil (Goiás), Paraguay and Trinidad.

== Biology ==
The food plant is unknown.
