= Uroplata nebulosa =

Scientific classification
- Kingdom: Animalia
- Phylum: Arthropoda
- Class: Insecta
- Order: Coleoptera
- Suborder: Polyphaga
- Infraorder: Cucujiformia
- Family: Chrysomelidae
- Genus: Uroplata
- Species: U. nebulosa

Binomial name
- Uroplata nebulosa Baly, 1885

Species of beetle

Uroplata nebulosa is a species of beetle of the family Chrysomelidae. It is found in Mexico.

== Description ==
The head is moderately produced between the eyes and the front is impressed on the medial line with a shallow longitudinal groove. The antennae are slender at the base, thickened towards the apex and rather more than a third the length of the body. The thorax is nearly twice as broad as long, the sides nearly straight and parallel at the base, rounded and dilated in the middle, converging at the apex, the anterior angle armed with a stout subacute tooth. It is transversely convex, the surface unequal, transversely excavated on either side just before the base, velvety, nearly impunctate on the sides, impressed on the middle disc with a few large piceous punctures. The lateral margin and base are stained with blackish-piceous. The scutellum is piceous. The elytra are much broader than the thorax, the sides gradually dilated from the middle to the posterior angle, the latter produced laterally into a triangular plate. The apical margin is slightly dilated, strongly and irregularly serrate, the lateral border finely serrulate. Each elytron has ten, at the extreme base with eleven, rows of deep punctures, the second, fourth, the basal portion of the sixth and the entire eighth interspaces, costate. The second costa is more strongly elevated than the rest, interrupted below the base and again before the middle. The apical portion of the suture distinctly costate.

== Biology ==
The food plant is unknown.
