= Baliosus pretiosus =

Scientific classification
- Kingdom: Animalia
- Phylum: Arthropoda
- Clade: Pancrustacea
- Class: Insecta
- Order: Coleoptera
- Suborder: Polyphaga
- Infraorder: Cucujiformia
- Family: Chrysomelidae
- Genus: Baliosus
- Species: B. pretiosus

Binomial name
- Baliosus pretiosus (Baly, 1864)

Synonyms
- Uroplata pretiosus Baly, 1864

Species of beetle

Baliosus pretiosus is a species of beetle of the family Chrysomelidae. It is found in Brazil (Amazonas).

== Description ==
The head is moderately produced between the eyes and the vertex is granulose, fulvous yellow. The antennae and a spot on the vertex are black. The thorax is one-third broader at its base than long, with the sides rounded, while nearly straight behind and narrowed and sinuate in front, the anterior angles armed with a short obtuse tooth. There is a broad vitta down the middle, which is (together with the lateral border) black. The scutellum is shining black, curved and triangular. The elytra are much broader than the thorax, slightly increasing in width towards their apex and with the sides narrowly margined, their outer edge serrate, margin slightly dilated towards the posterior angles, which are produced obliquely outwards and backwards into a flattened acute tooth. The apex is obtusely rounded, with the apical margin slightly dilated, its outer edge serrate. Each elytron has four raised costae, the third obsolete in the middle, suture also elevated, interspaces each with a double row of deep, large, regular punctures.
