= Uroplata fiebrigi =

Scientific classification
- Kingdom: Animalia
- Phylum: Arthropoda
- Class: Insecta
- Order: Coleoptera
- Suborder: Polyphaga
- Infraorder: Cucujiformia
- Family: Chrysomelidae
- Genus: Uroplata
- Species: U. fiebrigi

Binomial name
- Uroplata fiebrigi Spaeth, 1937

Species of beetle

Uroplata fiebrigi is a species of beetle of the family Chrysomelidae. It is found in Argentina and Paraguay.

== Biology ==
The recorded food plants are Dicliptera species.
