= Baliosus conspersus =

Scientific classification
- Kingdom: Animalia
- Phylum: Arthropoda
- Clade: Pancrustacea
- Class: Insecta
- Order: Coleoptera
- Suborder: Polyphaga
- Infraorder: Cucujiformia
- Family: Chrysomelidae
- Genus: Baliosus
- Species: B. conspersus

Binomial name
- Baliosus conspersus Weise, 1911

Species of beetle

Baliosus conspersus is a species of beetle of the family Chrysomelidae. It is found in Argentina, Brazil and Paraguay.

== Biology ==
This species has been found feeding on Hippocrates griesebachi and Arrabidea coleocalyx.
