= Baliosus subapicalis =

Scientific classification
- Kingdom: Animalia
- Phylum: Arthropoda
- Clade: Pancrustacea
- Class: Insecta
- Order: Coleoptera
- Suborder: Polyphaga
- Infraorder: Cucujiformia
- Family: Chrysomelidae
- Genus: Baliosus
- Species: B. subapicalis

Binomial name
- Baliosus subapicalis (Baly, 1885)

Synonyms
- Chalepus subapicalis Baly, 1885

Species of beetle

Baliosus subapicalis is a species of beetle of the family Chrysomelidae. It is found in Mexico.

== Description ==
The vertex is smooth and impunctate, the front longitudinally grooved, finely rugose-punctate on either side and the interocular space very slightly produced. The antennae are slightly longer than the head and thorax, robust and slightly increasing in thickness towards the apex. The thorax is transverse, the sides slightly but distinctly angulate, straight and nearly parallel from the base to the middle, then obliquely converging towards the apex, transversely convex, excavated on the hinder disc, closely, deeply, and coarsely punctured. The elytra are broader than the thorax, the sides regularly but only slightly dilated from the base towards the apex, the apex itself obtusely rounded, the outer margin rather strongly serrulate. Each elytron at the extreme base with ten, just before the middle with nine, rows of punctures, the second, fourth, and eighth interspaces costate, the sixth also elevated at its base and apex.
