= Uroplata costaricana =

Scientific classification
- Kingdom: Animalia
- Phylum: Arthropoda
- Class: Insecta
- Order: Coleoptera
- Suborder: Polyphaga
- Infraorder: Cucujiformia
- Family: Chrysomelidae
- Genus: Uroplata
- Species: U. costaricana

Binomial name
- Uroplata costaricana Pic, 1932

Species of beetle

Uroplata costaricana is a species of beetle of the family Chrysomelidae. It is found in Costa Rica.

== Biology ==
The food plant is unknown.
