= Baliosus illustris =

Scientific classification
- Kingdom: Animalia
- Phylum: Arthropoda
- Clade: Pancrustacea
- Class: Insecta
- Order: Coleoptera
- Suborder: Polyphaga
- Infraorder: Cucujiformia
- Family: Chrysomelidae
- Genus: Baliosus
- Species: B. illustris

Binomial name
- Baliosus illustris (Weise, 1905)

Synonyms
- Uroplata illustris Weise, 1905

Species of beetle

Baliosus illustris is a species of beetle of the family Chrysomelidae. It is found in Bolivia and Brazil (Goyaz).
