= Baliosus baeri =

Scientific classification
- Kingdom: Animalia
- Phylum: Arthropoda
- Clade: Pancrustacea
- Class: Insecta
- Order: Coleoptera
- Suborder: Polyphaga
- Infraorder: Cucujiformia
- Family: Chrysomelidae
- Genus: Baliosus
- Species: B. baeri

Binomial name
- Baliosus baeri Pic, 1932

Species of beetle

Baliosus baeri is a species of beetle of the family Chrysomelidae. It is found in Peru.
