= Uroplata distinguenda =

Scientific classification
- Kingdom: Animalia
- Phylum: Arthropoda
- Class: Insecta
- Order: Coleoptera
- Suborder: Polyphaga
- Infraorder: Cucujiformia
- Family: Chrysomelidae
- Genus: Uroplata
- Species: U. distinguenda

Binomial name
- Uroplata distinguenda Baly, 1885

Species of beetle

Uroplata distinguenda is a species of beetle of the family Chrysomelidae. It is found in Panama.

== Description ==
The vertex and front are impressed with a faint longitudinal groove, opaque, impunctate interocular space slightly produced. The antennae are about one third the length of the body. The thorax is transverse, the sides subangulate, converging from the base to the apex, the disc opaque, vaguely punctured, a broad discoidal vitta, black. The elytra are broader than the thorax, the sides parallel from the base to the middle, then slightly dilated towards the posterior angle, the latter armed with an oblique spine. The apical margin is rounded, armed with short spines. Each elytron has ten, at the extreme base with eleven, rows of punctures, the second, fourth, and eighth interspaces costate, the apical half of the sixth also slightly elevated.

== Biology ==
The food plant is unknown.
