= Baliosus dentipes =

Scientific classification
- Kingdom: Animalia
- Phylum: Arthropoda
- Clade: Pancrustacea
- Class: Insecta
- Order: Coleoptera
- Suborder: Polyphaga
- Infraorder: Cucujiformia
- Family: Chrysomelidae
- Genus: Baliosus
- Species: B. dentipes

Binomial name
- Baliosus dentipes Weise, 1910

Species of beetle

Baliosus dentipes is a species of beetle of the family Chrysomelidae. It is found in Colombia.
