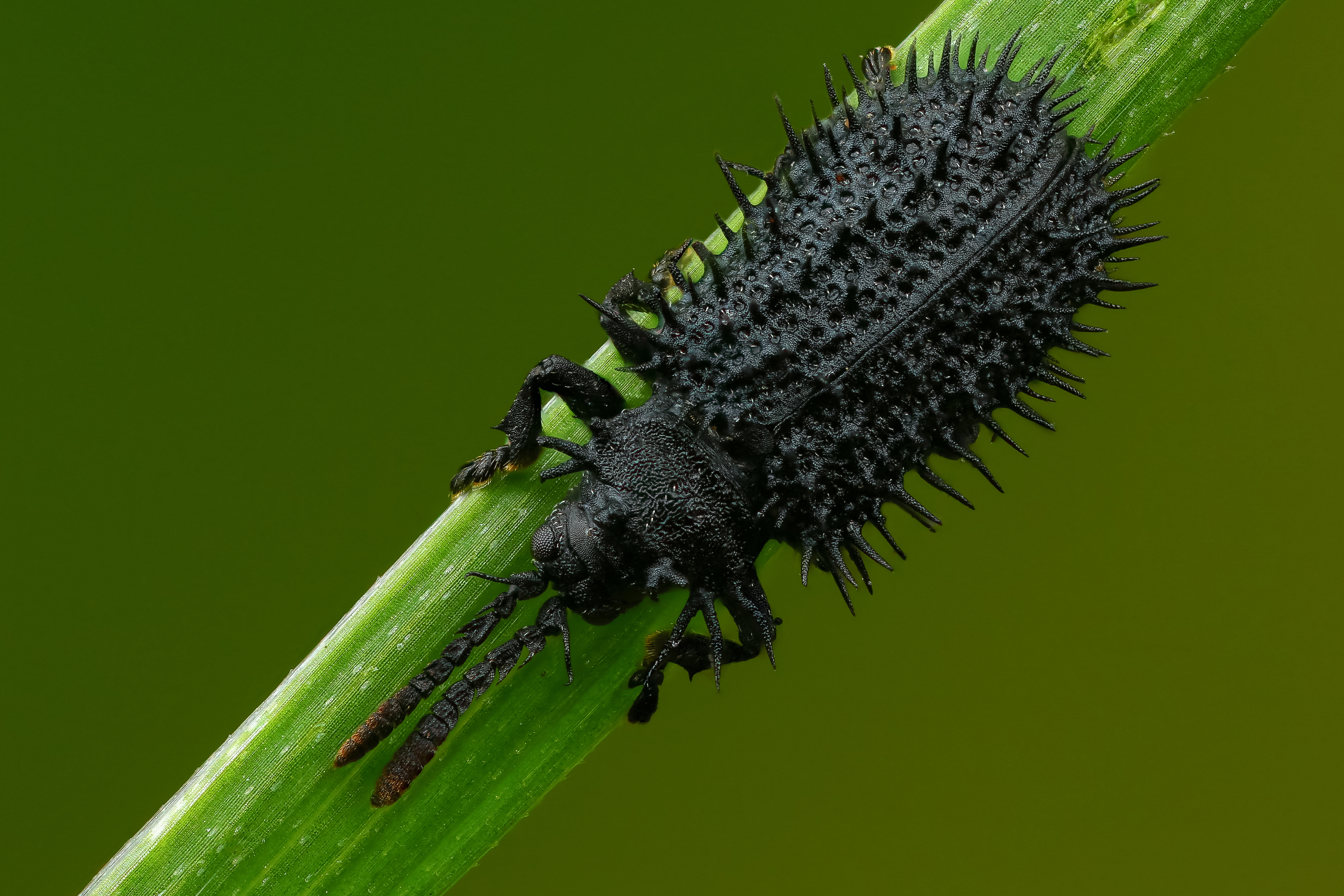

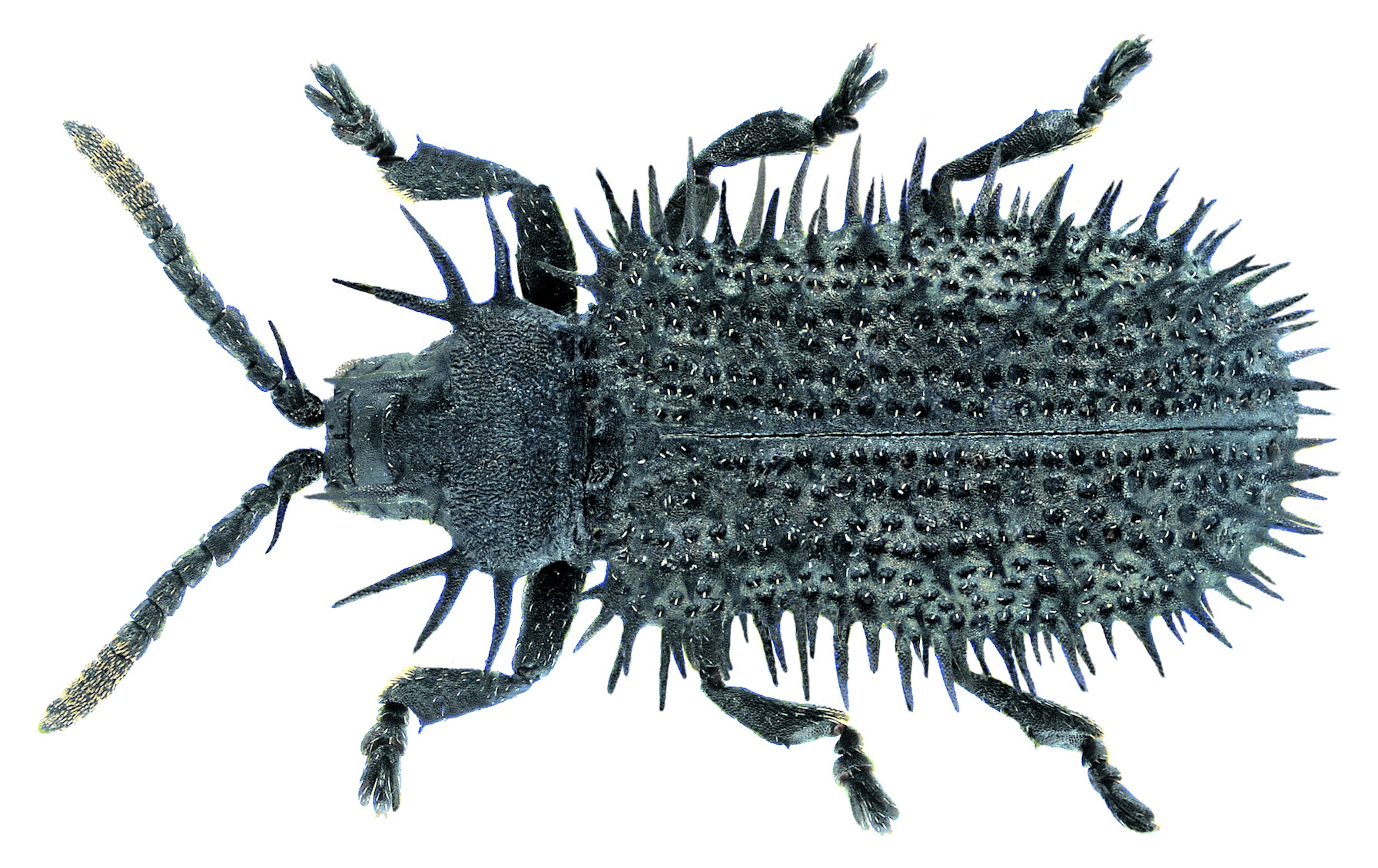

Scientific classification
- Kingdom: Animalia
- Phylum: Arthropoda
- Clade: Pancrustacea
- Class: Insecta
- Order: Coleoptera
- Suborder: Polyphaga
- Infraorder: Cucujiformia
- Family: Chrysomelidae
- Genus: Hispa
- Species: H. atra

Binomial name
- Hispa atra Linnaeus, 1767

Synonyms
- Hispa algira Motschulsky, 1861; Hispa aptera Motschulsky, 1861; Hispa minuta Balbi, 1892; Hispa balbii Donckier, 1899; Hispa cariosa Reiche & Sauley, 1858

= Hispa atra =

Species of beetle

Hispa atra is a species of beetle of the family Chrysomelidae. It is found across most of Europe and large parts of Asia and North Africa.

== Life history ==
The recorded host plants for this species are Dactylis, Poa, Elytrigia, Calamagrostis, Agrostis, Helictotrichon and Triticum species, as well as Apropyrum repans and Elymus repens. They mine the leaves of their host plant. The mine starts at the tip of the leaf, and has the form of a tunnel that widens gradually. Pupation can take place both inside and outside the mine.
