= Baliosus parvulus =

Scientific classification
- Kingdom: Animalia
- Phylum: Arthropoda
- Clade: Pancrustacea
- Class: Insecta
- Order: Coleoptera
- Suborder: Polyphaga
- Infraorder: Cucujiformia
- Family: Chrysomelidae
- Genus: Baliosus
- Species: B. parvulus

Binomial name
- Baliosus parvulus (Chapuis, 1877)

Synonyms
- Uroplata (Uroplata) parvulus Chapuis, 1877

Species of beetle

Baliosus parvulus is a species of beetle of the family Chrysomelidae. It is found in Argentina, Brazil (Bahia, Matto Grosso, Rio Grande do Sul, Rio de Janeiro, São Paulo, Pernambuco) and Paraguay.

== Biology ==
This species has been found feeding on Meibomia axillaries, Cordia polystachya, Cordia salicifolia, Vernonia sororia, Urtica species, Olyra species and Platymenia foliosa.
