= Uroplata decipiens =

Scientific classification
- Kingdom: Animalia
- Phylum: Arthropoda
- Class: Insecta
- Order: Coleoptera
- Suborder: Polyphaga
- Infraorder: Cucujiformia
- Family: Chrysomelidae
- Genus: Uroplata
- Species: U. decipiens

Binomial name
- Uroplata decipiens Uhmann, 1931

Species of beetle

Uroplata decipiens is a species of beetle of the family Chrysomelidae. It is found in Peru.

== Biology ==
The food plant is unknown.

== Taxonomy ==
The species should not be confused with Probaenia decipiens which was originally described as Uroplata decipiens by Chapuis in 1877.
