= Baliosus antennatus =

Scientific classification
- Kingdom: Animalia
- Phylum: Arthropoda
- Clade: Pancrustacea
- Class: Insecta
- Order: Coleoptera
- Suborder: Polyphaga
- Infraorder: Cucujiformia
- Family: Chrysomelidae
- Genus: Baliosus
- Species: B. antennatus

Binomial name
- Baliosus antennatus (Guérin-Méneville in Cuvier, 1844)

Synonyms
- Uroplata antennata Guérin-Méneville, 1844

Species of beetle

Baliosus antennatus is a species of beetle of the family Chrysomelidae. It is found in Colombia.
