= Uroplata submarginalis =

Scientific classification
- Kingdom: Animalia
- Phylum: Arthropoda
- Clade: Pancrustacea
- Class: Insecta
- Order: Coleoptera
- Suborder: Polyphaga
- Infraorder: Cucujiformia
- Family: Chrysomelidae
- Genus: Uroplata
- Species: U. submarginalis

Binomial name
- Uroplata submarginalis Baly, 1864

Species of beetle

Uroplata submarginalis is a species of beetle of the family Chrysomelidae. It is found in Brazil (Amazonas).

== Description ==
The head is very slightly produced between the eyes and the vertex is smooth. The antennae are nearly one-third of the length of the body and moderately robust. The thorax is one-half broader than long, with the sides rounded and narrowed towards the apex, nearly straight and parallel at the base, above transversely convex, flattened and transversely depressed on the hinder disk, coarsely punctured, the punctures subrugose on the sides, more distant on the disk. The scutellum is oblique at the base, its apical half horizontal. The elytra are much broader than the thorax, the lateral border narrow, serrate and with the interspace between the second and third costae broad, impressed with three or more somewhat confused rows of punctures.

== Biology ==
The food plant is unknown.
