= Uroplata confusa =

Scientific classification
- Kingdom: Animalia
- Phylum: Arthropoda
- Class: Insecta
- Order: Coleoptera
- Suborder: Polyphaga
- Infraorder: Cucujiformia
- Family: Chrysomelidae
- Genus: Uroplata
- Species: U. confusa

Binomial name
- Uroplata confusa Uhmann, 1959

Species of beetle

Uroplata confusa is a species of beetle of the family Chrysomelidae. It is found in Brazil (Rio Grande do Sul).

== Biology ==
The recorded food plant is Baccharis trimera.
