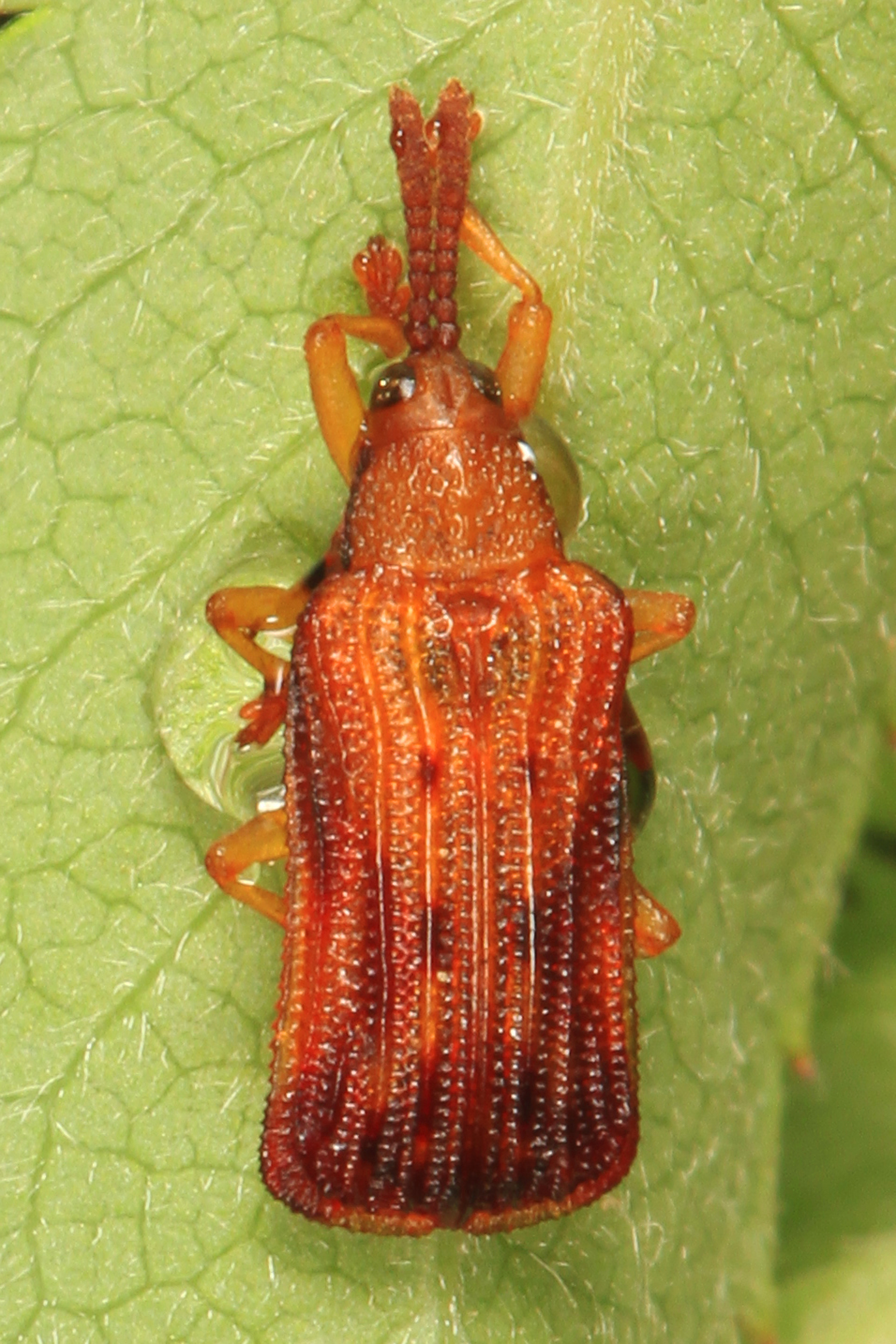

Scientific classification
- Kingdom: Animalia
- Phylum: Arthropoda
- Clade: Pancrustacea
- Class: Insecta
- Order: Coleoptera
- Suborder: Polyphaga
- Infraorder: Cucujiformia
- Family: Chrysomelidae
- Genus: Baliosus
- Species: B. nervosus

Binomial name
- Baliosus nervosus (Panzer, 1794)

Synonyms
- Hispa nervosus Panzer, 1794; Hispa marginata Say, 1824; Hispa pallipes Germar, 1824; Hispa quadratus Fabricius, 1801; Hispa rubra Weber, 1801; Hispa quercifoliae Harris, 1835

= Baliosus nervosus =

Species of beetle

Baliosus nervosus, the basswood leaf miner, is a species of leaf beetle in the family Chrysomelidae. It is found in North America. Its typical host is basswood, and adults skeletonize the surface of leaves. Larvae have been known to create leaf mines on soybean leaves.

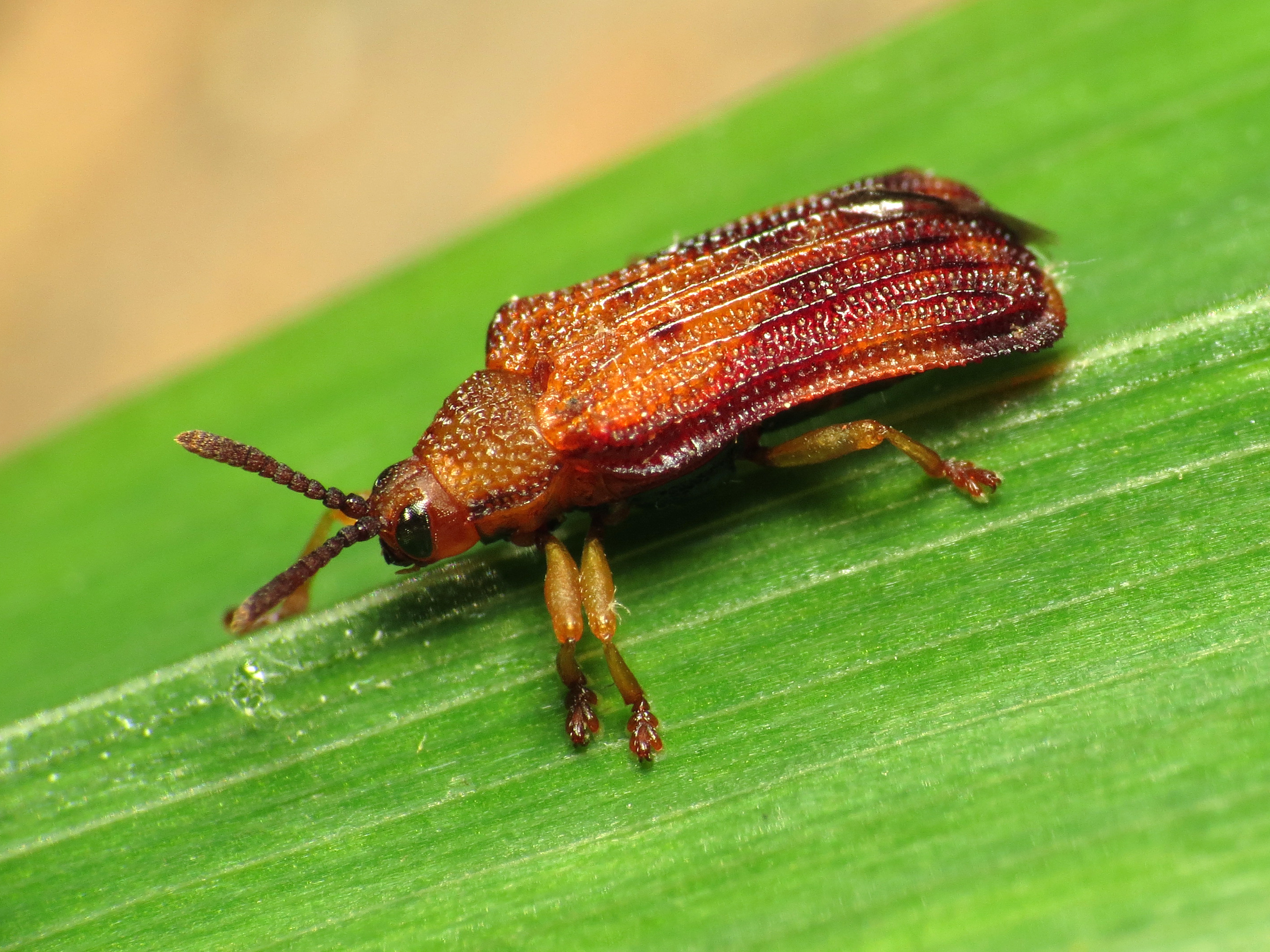
Basswood leaf miner, Baliosus nervosus
