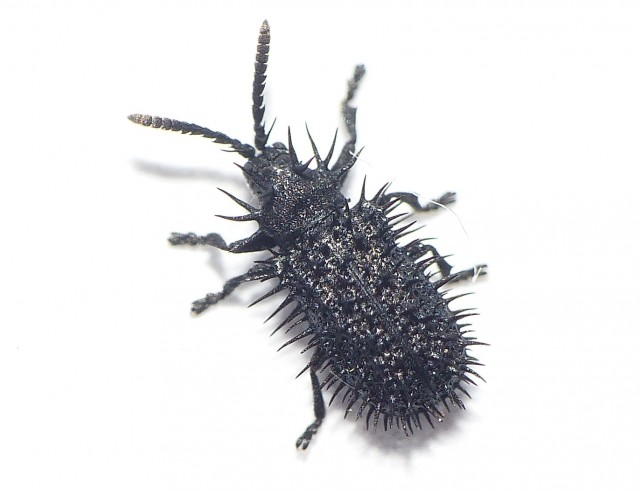
- Hispa atra

Scientific classification
- Kingdom: Animalia
- Phylum: Arthropoda
- Clade: Pancrustacea
- Class: Insecta
- Order: Coleoptera
- Suborder: Polyphaga
- Infraorder: Cucujiformia
- Family: Chrysomelidae
- Subfamily: Cassidinae
- Tribe: Hispini
- Genus: Hispa; Linnaeus, 1767

Synonyms
- Hispella Chapuis, 1875

= Hispa =

Genus of beetles

Hispa is the type genus of leaf beetles in the tibe Hispini (subfamily Cassidinae). Species are recorded from Africa, the Palaearctic and Oriental realms.

== Species ==
The Global Biodiversity Information Facility includes:

- Hispa atra Linnaeus, 1767
- Hispa brachycera (Gestro, 1897)
- Hispa fulvispinosa Medvedev, 1992
- Hispa ramosa Gyllenhal, 1817
- Hispa stygia (Chapuis, 1877)
- Hispa tarsata Swietojanska, 2001
- Hispa waiensis Borowiec & Swietojanska, 2007

== Selected former species ==
- Hispa echidna Guérin-Méneville, 1840 (now in Platypria)
- Hispa mutica Linnaeus, 1767 (now in Orthocerus)
- Hispa mystacina Fabricius, 1775
- Hispa rubra Weber, 1801
