= Uroplata rudis =

Scientific classification
- Kingdom: Animalia
- Phylum: Arthropoda
- Class: Insecta
- Order: Coleoptera
- Suborder: Polyphaga
- Infraorder: Cucujiformia
- Family: Chrysomelidae
- Genus: Uroplata
- Species: U. rudis

Binomial name
- Uroplata rudis Uhmann, 1937

Species of beetle

Uroplata rudis is a species of beetle of the family Chrysomelidae. It is found in Paraguay.

== Biology ==
The food plant is unknown.
