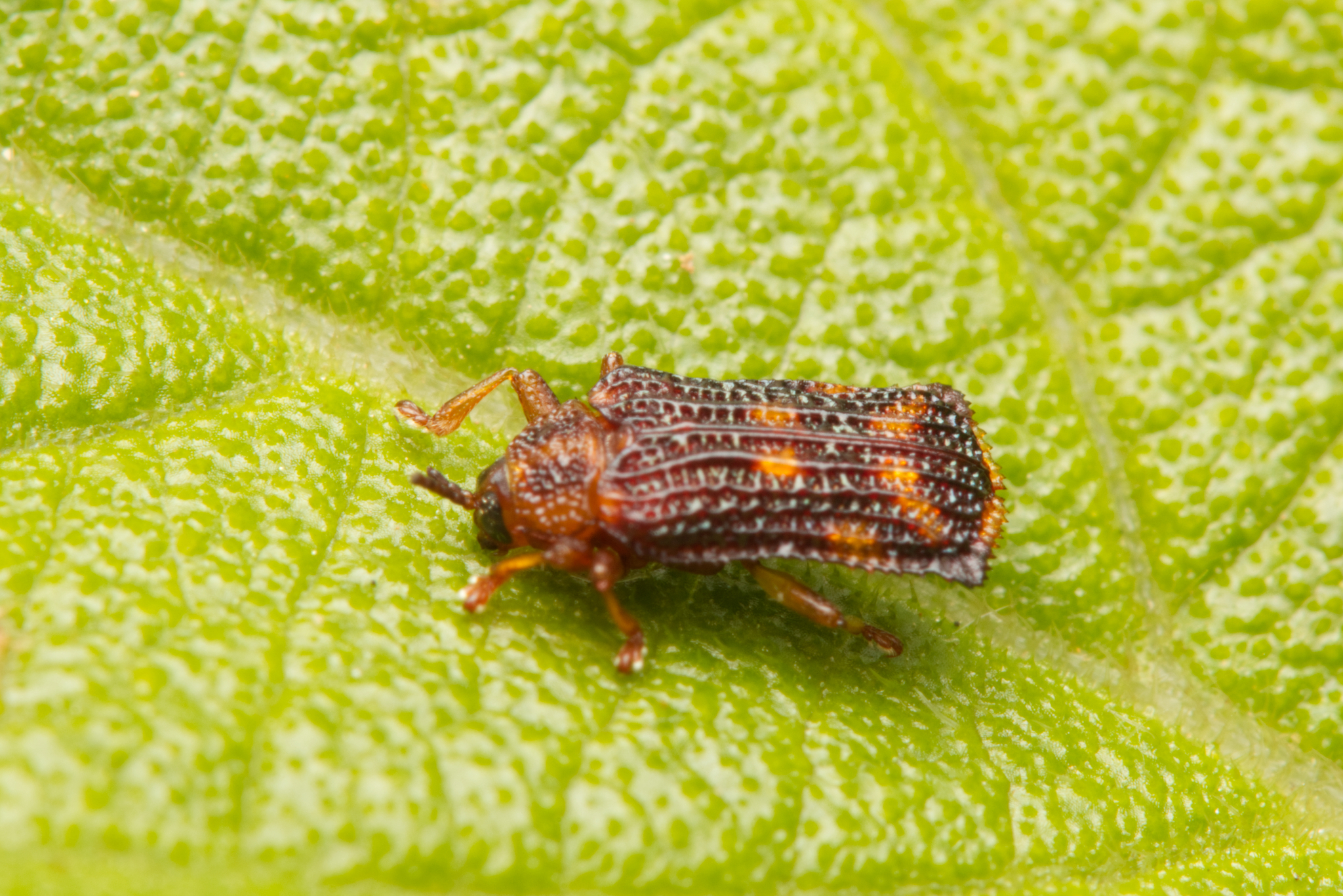

Scientific classification
- Kingdom: Animalia
- Phylum: Arthropoda
- Clade: Pancrustacea
- Class: Insecta
- Order: Coleoptera
- Suborder: Polyphaga
- Infraorder: Cucujiformia
- Family: Chrysomelidae
- Genus: Uroplata
- Species: U. girardi

Binomial name
- Uroplata girardi Pic, 1934

Synonyms
- Uroplata compacta Spaeth, 1937

= Uroplata girardi =

Species of beetle

Uroplata girardi is a species of beetle of the family Chrysomelidae. It is native to Argentina, Brazil (Bahia, Minas Gerais, Rio Grande do Sul, Santa Catarina, São Paulo, Pernambuco) and Paraguay, but has been introduced to Australia, the Caroline Islands, Cook Islands, Fiji, Ghana, Guam, Hawaii, India, the Mariana Islands, Mauritius, New Caledonia, Niue, Papua New Guinea, Palau, the Philippines, Samoa, the Solomon Islands, South Africa, Tanzania, the Tonga Islands, Trinidad, Uganda, Vanuatu and Zambia.

== Biology ==
The recorded food plant for the larvae is Lantana camara. Adults feed on Lippia alba, Lantana montevidensis, Lantana trifolia, Tectona grandis and Verbena triphylla.
