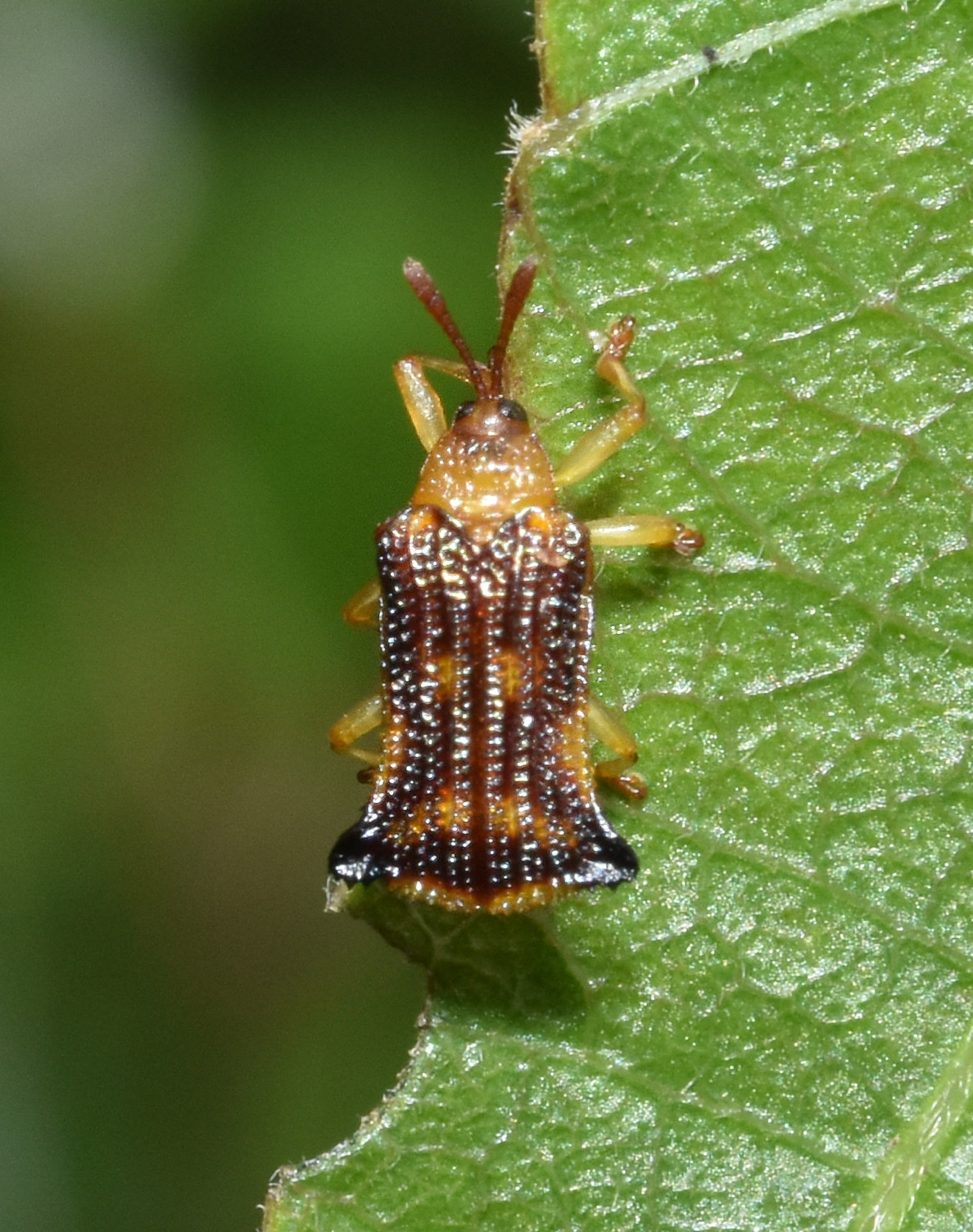

Scientific classification
- Kingdom: Animalia
- Phylum: Arthropoda
- Clade: Pancrustacea
- Class: Insecta
- Order: Coleoptera
- Suborder: Polyphaga
- Infraorder: Cucujiformia
- Family: Chrysomelidae
- Genus: Uroplata
- Species: U. fulvopustulata

Binomial name
- Uroplata fulvopustulata Baly, 1885

= Uroplata fulvopustulata =

Species of beetle

Uroplata fulvopustulata is a species of beetle of the family Chrysomelidae. It is found in Colombia, Costa Rica, Guatemala, Mexico, Nicaragua, Panama and possibly Brazil. It has been introduced to Australia (where it is found in northern Queensland), Fiji and South Africa.

== Description ==
The head is very slightly produced between the eyes, while the front and vertex are smooth and impunctate. The antennae are more than one third the length of the body, slender at the base, thickened towards the apex, their joints cylindrical. The thorax is twice as broad at the base as long, the sides straight and slightly converging from the base to the middle, then more quickly converging and slightly sinuate to the apex, the anterior angle armed with a subacute tooth. The upper surface is transversely convex, transversely excavated on the hinder disc, coarsely and irregularly punctured. The elytra are much broader than the thorax, the sides gradually dilated from just before the middle to the posterior angle, the latter produced into a triangular concave plate. The apical margin is obtuse and distinctly serrate and the lateral margin is finely and subremotely serrulate. Each elytron has ten, at the extreme base with eleven, rows of punctures. The suture, together with each alternate interspace is costate. The humeral callus is laterally prominent, fusco-seneous and marked with numerous small fulvous patches.

== Biology ==
The recorded food plants are Lantana camara, Lippia muriocephala, Pithecoctenium echinatum, Calea species and Lippia species.
