= L. abyssinica =

L. abyssinica can refer to a few different species. The specific epithet abyssinica refers to Ethiopia, where many of these species may be found.

- Lachnocnema abyssinica, a butterfly in the family Lycaenidae
- Lactuca abyssinica, a synonym for Lactuca inermis, a plant in the family Asteraceae
- Lagenaria abyssinica, a squash in the family Cucurbitaceae
- Laguna abyssinica, a plant in the family Malvaceae
- Lantana abyssinica, synonym of Lippia abyssinica, a plant in the family Verbenaceae
- Lapeirousia abyssinica, a plant in the family Iridaceae
- Lasiocorys abyssinica, a plant in the family Lamiaceae
- Lavatera abyssinica, a synonym for Malva aethiopica, a mallow in the family Malvaceae
- Lecanora abyssinica, a lichen in the family Lecanoraceae
- Lefebvrea abyssinica, a plant in the family Apiaceae
- Lejeunea abyssinica, a plant in the family Lejeuneaceae
- Lens abyssinica, a plant in the family Fabaceae
- Leobordea abyssinica, a plant in the family Fabaceae
- Leptadenia abyssinica, a plant in the family Apocynaceae
- Leptomastix abyssinica, a parasitic wasp in the family Encyrtidae
- Leptorkis abyssinica, a plant in the family Orchidaceae
- Leucas abyssinica, a plant in the family Lamiaceae
- Leucauge abyssinica, a spider in the family Tetragnathidae
- Lightfootia abyssinica, a plant in the family Campanulaceae
- Limnophora abyssinica, a fly in the family Muscidae
- Lindenbergia abyssinica, a plant in the family Orobanchaceae
- Lindernia abyssinica, a plant in the family Linderniaceae
- Liparis abyssinica, a plant in the family Orchidaceae
- Lipotriche abyssinica, a plant in the family Asteraceae
- Lippia abyssinica, a culinary herb in the family Verbenaceae
- Loxogramme abyssinica, a plant in the family Polypodiaceae
- Ludwigia abyssinica, a plant in the family Onagraceae
- Lusciniola abyssinica, a bird in the family Acrocephalidae
- Luzula abyssinica, a plant in the family Juncaceae
- Lychnis abyssinica, a plant in the family Caryophyllaceae
