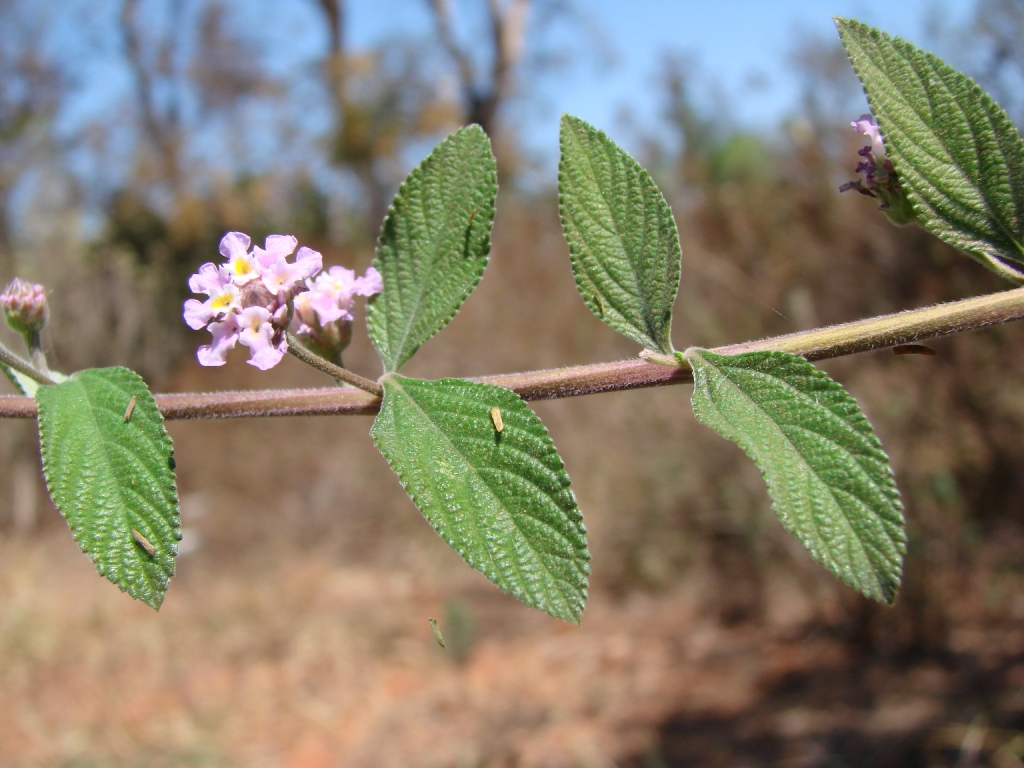
- Lippia alba

Scientific classification
- Kingdom: Plantae
- Clade: Tracheophytes
- Clade: Angiosperms
- Clade: Eudicots
- Clade: Asterids
- Order: Lamiales
- Family: Verbenaceae
- Genus: Lippia; L.

Type species
- Lippia americana L.

Species
- See text

Synonyms
- Bertolonia Raf., nom. illeg.; Burroughsia Moldenke; Dipterocalyx Cham.; Goniostachyum (Schauer) Small; Zapania Lam., orth. var.; Zappania Scop.

= Lippia =

Genus of flowering plants

Lippia is a genus of flowering plants in the verbena family, Verbenaceae. It was named after Augustin Lippi (1678–1705), a French-Italian naturalist and botanist. The genus contains roughly 200 species of tropical shrubs that are found around the world. Plants are fragrant due to their essential oils, which vary between species but may include estragole, carvacrol, linalool or limonene. The leaves of certain species, such as L. graveolens, can be used as a culinary herb similar to oregano.

== Selected species ==
- Lippia abyssinica (Otto & A.Dietr.) Cufod. – Ethiopia
- Lippia alba (Mill.) N.E.Br. ex Britton & P.Wilson – Bushy lippia, white lippia (United States (Texas), Mexico, the Caribbean, Central America, and South America)
- Lippia carterae (Moldenke) G.L.Nesom – Licorice verbena (Baja California, Mexico)
- Lippia dulcis Trevir.
- Lippia durangensis Moldenke
- Lippia graveolens Kunth – Mexican oregano, scented lippia, scented matgrass (Southwestern United States, Mexico, and Central America as far south as Nicaragua)
- Lippia javanica (Burm.f.) Spreng.
- Lippia kituiensis Vatke
- Lippia micromera Schauer – False oregano (Central America, the Caribbean, and northern South America)
- Lippia multiflora Moldenke
- Lippia myriocephala Schltdl. & Cham.
- Lippia palmeri S.Watson
- Lippia pretoriensis H.Pearson
- Lippia rehmannii H.Pearson
- Lippia salicifolia Andersson (Ecuador)
- Lippia scaberrima Sond.
- Lippia sidoides Cham.
- Lippia stoechadifolia (L.) Kunth
- Lippia substrigosa Turcz.
- Lippia thymoides Mart. & Schauer

=== Formerly placed here ===
- Aloysia citrodora Palau (as L. citrodora Kunth or L. triphylla (L'Hér.) Kuntze)
- Aloysia lycioides Cham. (as L. lycioides (Cham.) Steud.)
- Aloysia scorodonioides (Kunth) Cham. (as L. scorodonioides Kunth or L. wrightii A.Gray ex Torr.)
- Lantana montevidensis (Spreng.) Briq. (as L. montevidensis Spreng.)
- Lantana ukambensis (Vatke) Verdc. (as L. ukambensis Vatke)
- Mulguraea ligustrina (Lag.) N.O'Leary & P.Peralta (as L. ligustrina (Lag.) Britton)
- Phyla canescens (Kunth) Greene (as L. canescens Kunth or L. filiformis Schrad.)
- Phyla cuneifolia (Torr.) Greene (as L. cuneifolia (Torr.) Steud.)
- Phyla lanceolata (Michx.) Greene (as L. lanceolata Michx.)
- Phyla nodiflora (L.) Greene (as L. nodiflora (L.) Michx. or L. repens Spreng.)
- Salimenaea integrifolia (Griseb.) N.O'Leary & P.Moroni (as L. integrifolia (Griseb.) Hieron. or L. boliviana Rusby)
