= Lippia asperifolia =

Lippia asperifolia is a synonym for three species of plants, and may refer to:

- Lippia asperifolia Poepp. ex Cham., a synonym of Lippia alba (Mill.) N.E.Br. ex Britton & P.Wilson
- Lippia asperifolia Rchb., a synonym of Lippia dulcis Trevir.
- Lippia asperifolia A.Rich. ex Marthe, a synonym of Lippia javanica (Burm.f.) Spreng.
