= Bushy lippia =

Bushy lippia is a common name for several plants and may refer to:

- Lippia alba
- Phyla dulcis
