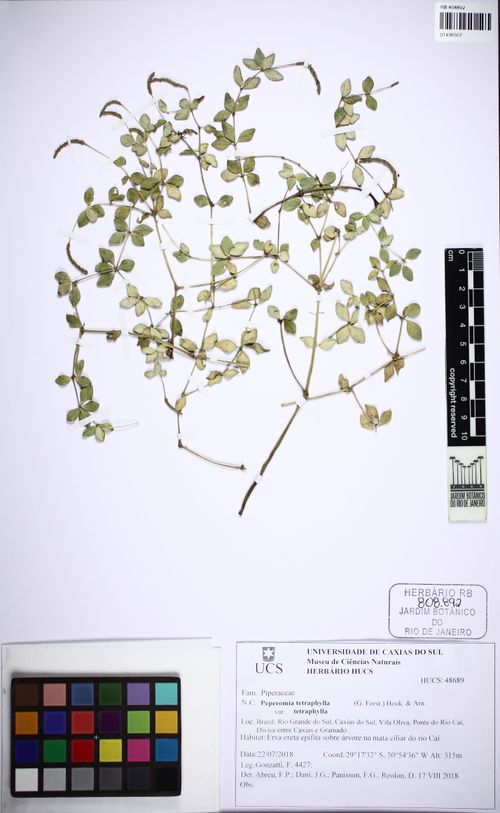

Scientific classification
- Kingdom: Plantae
- Clade: Tracheophytes
- Clade: Angiosperms
- Clade: Magnoliids
- Order: Piperales
- Family: Piperaceae
- Genus: Peperomia
- Species: P. tenella

Binomial name
- Peperomia tenella (Sw.) A.Dietr.

Synonyms
- Acrocarpidium tenellum (Sw.) Miq.; Peperomia palcipila var. longispica C.DC.; Piper tenellum Sw.

= Peperomia tenella =

Species of flower plants

Peperomia tenella, known as the Jayuya, is a species of perennial, lithophyte or epiphyte in the genus Peperomia. It was first described by Olof Swartz but named it Piper tenellum. Albert Gottfried Dietrich then changed the species into Peperomia and published in the book "Species Plantarum. editio sexta 1: 153. 1831". It primarily grows on wet tropical biomes. The species name came from the Latin word wikt:tenellus, which means tender.

== Description ==
It has a straightforward decumbent stem with an ascending spike and two oval, ciliated leaves.

There are three to four uncial stems that are hairy, hardly striate, smooth, rarely split, and minutely reddish-dotted. The stems are little, quickly petiolate, attenuate, obtuse, vigorous, sub-succulent, glabrous, pale below leaves. Filiform spike terminal. Scales severed at the sprout's side. No style. Stigma villous. A pedicel that is three times longer than the shoot, this pedicellate berry is about the size of a tiny needle head.

== Subtaxa ==
Following subtaxa are accepted.

- Peperomia tenella subsp. glabra C.DC.
- Peperomia tenella var. deltoides Trel.
- Peperomia tenella var. epiphytica Trel.
- Peperomia tenella var. glabra C.DC.

== Distribution ==
It is endemic to Caribbean, Central America, and South America.
