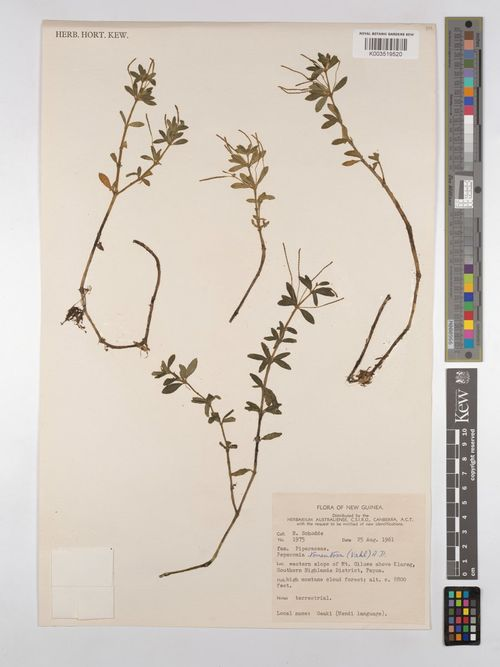

Scientific classification
- Kingdom: Plantae
- Clade: Tracheophytes
- Clade: Angiosperms
- Clade: Magnoliids
- Order: Piperales
- Family: Piperaceae
- Genus: Peperomia
- Species: P. tomentosa

Binomial name
- Peperomia tomentosa A.Dietr.

Synonyms
- Micropiper tomentosum Vahl) Miq.; Peperomia portulacoides var. pilosa Baker; Piper tomentosum Vahl

= Peperomia tomentosa =

Species of flowering plant

Peperomia tomentosa is a species of subshrub in the genus Peperomia found in parts of Southeast Asia. It primarily grows on wet tropical biomes. Its conservation status is Not Threatened.

== Description ==
The first specimens where collected in Indonesia.

Peperomia tomentosa has leaves that are hairy, suddenly having a longitudinal groove, with opposite leaves and subsessile ovate terns, pedunculate spikes, longer leaves.

The stems, like the rest of the plant, are softly hairy; Leaves have small amount of petioles, opposite a little smaller, obtuse, fleshy, has no visible veins. Peduncles from each upper axil and apex bear a single terminal pinches. Spikes are erect, a few inches or a little longer.

== Taxonomy and naming ==
It was described in 1831 by A.Dietr. in Species Plantarum. editio sexta, from specimens collected by Vahl. It got its name from the description of the leaves, which means 'covered in hairs'.

== Distribution and habitat ==
It is found in Seychelles and parts of Southeast Asia, specifically Indonesia, Philippines, and Papua New Guinea. It is a subshrub grows on wet tropical biomes.

== Conservation ==
This species is assessed as Not Threatened, in a preliminary report.
