= L. salicifolia =

L. salicifolia may refer to:

- Licania salicifolia, a plant species endemic to Colombia
- Lippia salicifolia, a plant species endemic to Ecuador

== See also ==
- Salicifolia (disambiguation)
