= Lippia abyssinica =

Koseret
- Lippia abyssinica isotype specimen

Scientific classification
- Kingdom: Plantae
- Clade: Tracheophytes
- Clade: Angiosperms
- Clade: Eudicots
- Clade: Asterids
- Order: Lamiales
- Family: Verbenaceae
- Genus: Lippia
- Species: L. abyssinica

Binomial name
- Lippia abyssinica (Otto & A.Dietr.) Cufod. 1969.

Synonyms
- List: Lantana abyssinica Otto & A.Dietr.; Lantana polycephala R.Br.; Lippia adoensis Hochst. ex Walp.; Lippia schimperi Hochst. ex Walp.; Lippia grandifolia Hochst. ex A.Rich.; Lippia grandifolia var. longipedunculata Moldenke; Lippia adoensis var. pubescens Moldenke; Lippia abyssinica var. pubescens (Moldenke) Moldenke; Lippia adoensis var. koseret Sebsebe

Species of flowering plant

Lippia abyssinica, or koseret (Amharic: ኮሰረት, romanized: koserēt), is a species of flowering plant in the verbena family, Verbenaceae. It is endemic to Ethiopia but cultivated throughout tropical African countries. The specific epithet abyssinica derives from Latin and means 'of or from Ethiopia (Abyssinia)'.

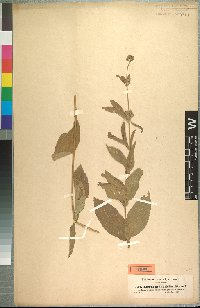
Herbarium specimen

The plant grows as a 3m tall shrubby herb at 1600–2000 m altitude in Ethiopia. It has hairy leaves and small flowers that are purple or pink.

Other common names include kosearut, lemon herb, butter clarifying herb, Gambey tea bush, and Gambia(n) tea bush, although the latter can also apply to Lippia multiflora. Besides the word koseret, in Amharic it is also called kesse or kessie. In Gurage it can be called koseret (Amharic: ኮሰሬት, romanized: koserēti), kesenet (Amharic: ክስንት, romanized: kisiniti), or quereret. Said in Tigrinya it is kusay. Kasey, kusaye, or kusaayee are the terms in the Oromo language. In French it is called verveine d’Afrique (literally 'African verbena'), Brégué Balenté, or Mousso et mâle. German speakers call it Gambia-Teestrauch (Gambia tea shrub). In Sierra Leone it is named a-kimbo and in the Congo it is called ngadi or dutmutzuri.

== Uses ==
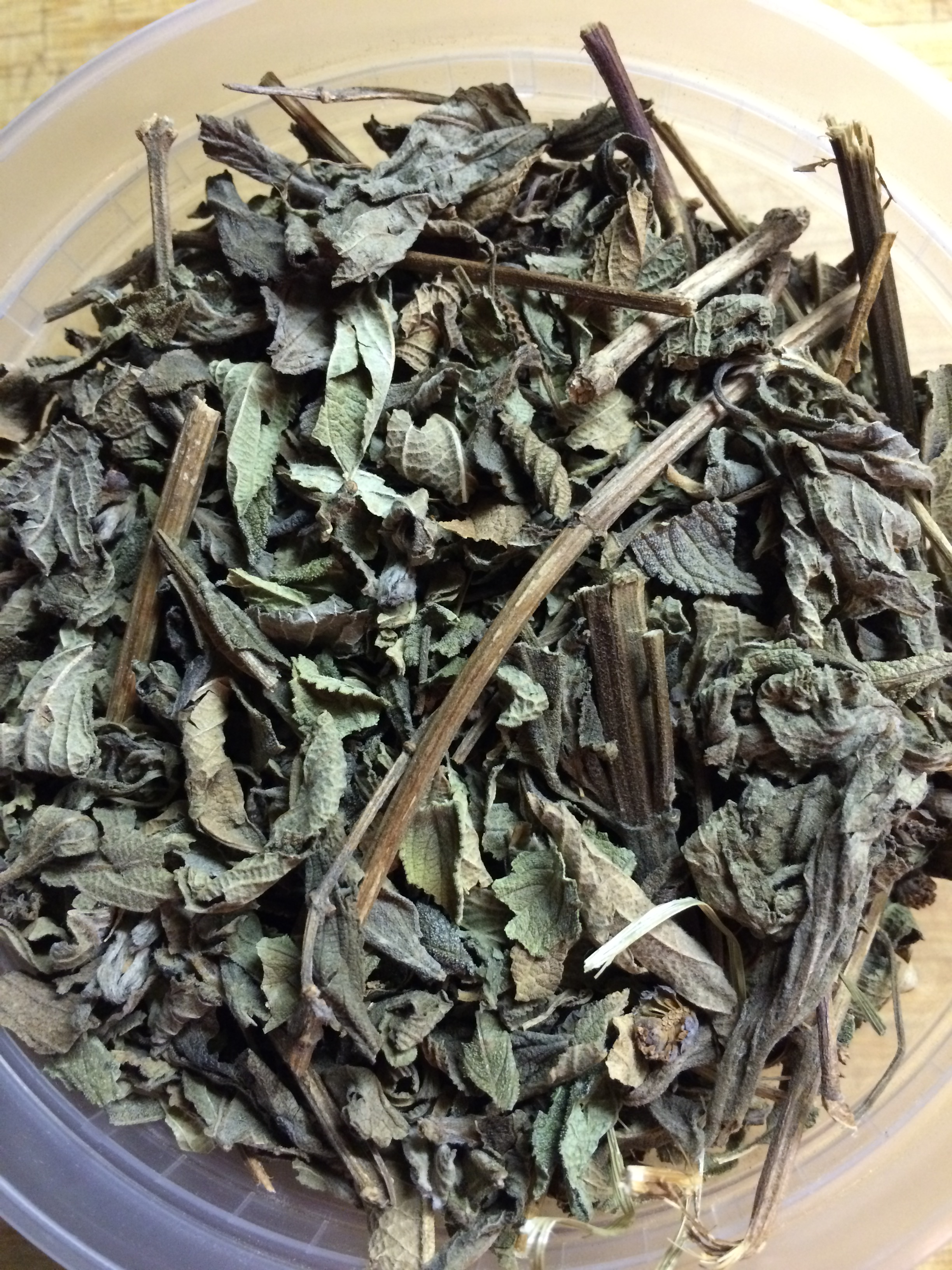
Dried koseret herb

Koseret, specifically the subspecies L. a. var. koseret, is dried and used as an herb in Ethiopian cuisine. The smell is camphorous and minty. Some describe its flavor as being similar to basil, but it is not closely related to that herb (they are merely in the same order, Lamiales). Koseret is closely related to the herb Mexican oregano (not to be confused with oregano), sharing the same genus Lippia. It is commonly used in making the spiced oils niter kibbeh and ye'qimem zeyet and the spice mix afrinj. Koseret along with the other herbs and spices preserve the butter and oil, preventing spoilage for up to 15 years. In these preparations koseret then flavors many common dishes, such as kitfo. In Democratic Republic of the Congo and Republic of the Congo it is eaten as a potherb. In west Africa, notably The Gambia, it is brewed into a tisane as a substitute for tea.

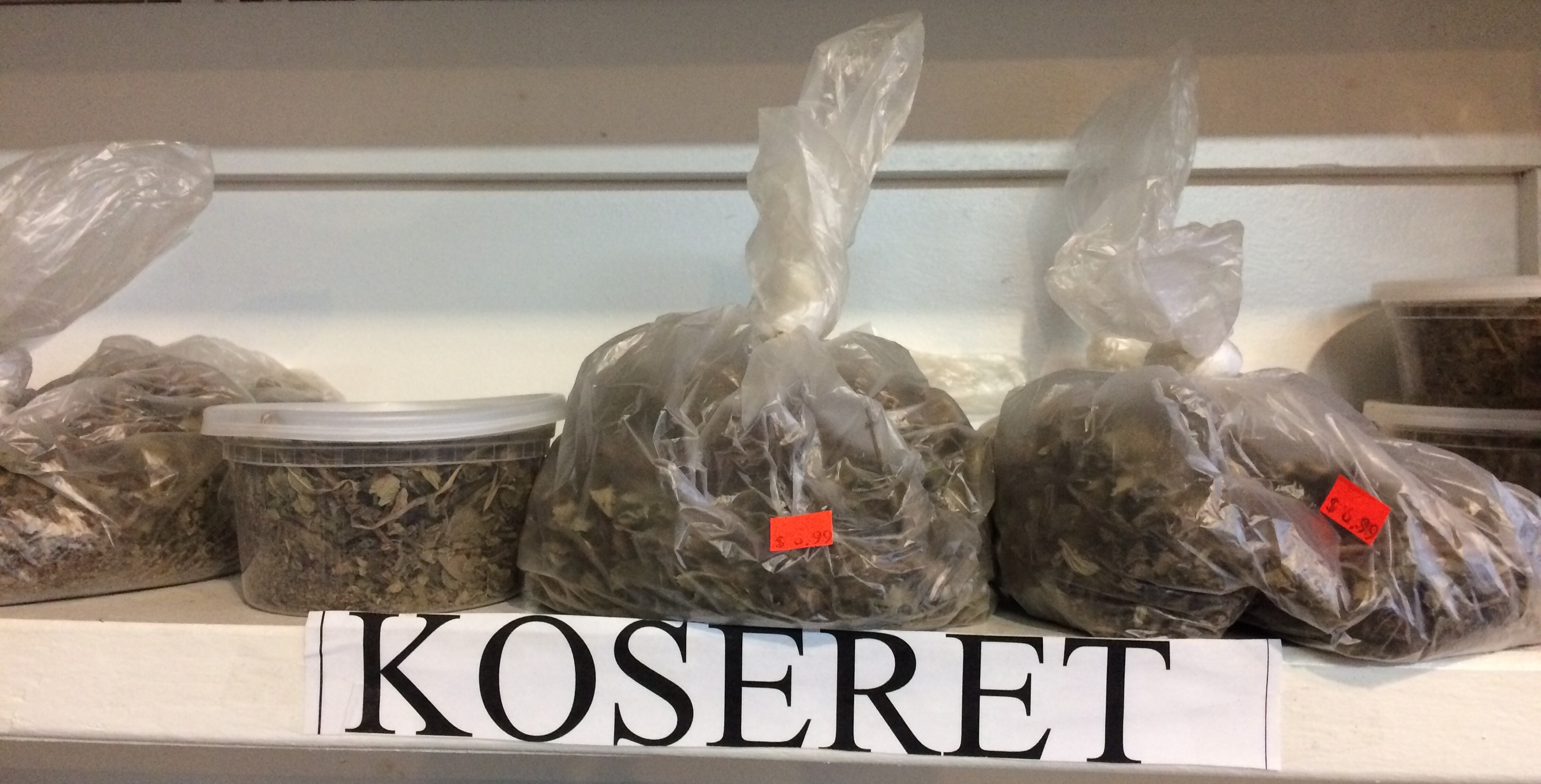
Dried koseret for sale

The plant has also been used as traditional medicine for cough, fever, constipation, and cutaneous conditions such as burns. It also is used as an insecticide and antimicrobial treatment and shows some promising antibacterial properties. Koseret has some antioxidant activity as well.
