= Lachnocnema sosia =

Scientific classification
- Kingdom: Animalia
- Phylum: Arthropoda
- Class: Insecta
- Order: Lepidoptera
- Family: Lycaenidae
- Genus: Lachnocnema
- Species: L. sosia

Binomial name
- Lachnocnema sosia Libert, 1996

Species of butterfly

Lachnocnema sosia is a butterfly in the family Lycaenidae. It is found in Uganda, Kenya, the Democratic Republic of the Congo and northern Tanzania.
