= Lachnocnema congoensis =

Scientific classification
- Kingdom: Animalia
- Phylum: Arthropoda
- Class: Insecta
- Order: Lepidoptera
- Family: Lycaenidae
- Genus: Lachnocnema
- Species: L. congoensis

Binomial name
- Lachnocnema congoensis Libert, 1996

Species of butterfly

Lachnocnema congoensis is a butterfly in the family Lycaenidae. It is found in the south-western part of the Republic of the Congo.
