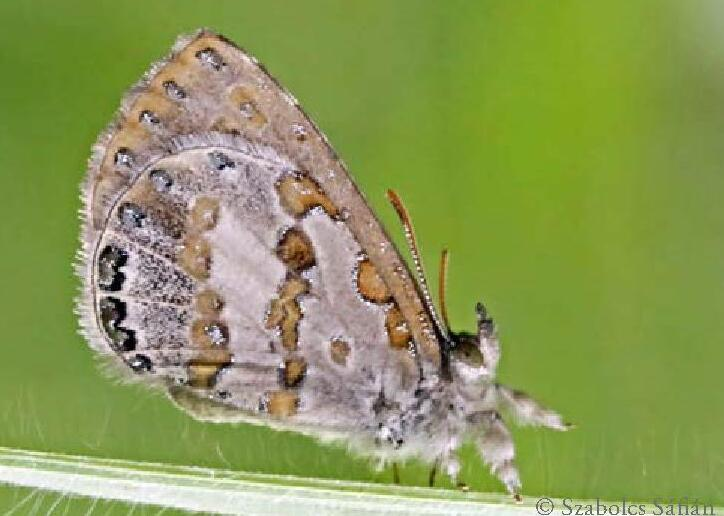

Scientific classification
- Kingdom: Animalia
- Phylum: Arthropoda
- Clade: Pancrustacea
- Class: Insecta
- Order: Lepidoptera
- Family: Lycaenidae
- Genus: Lachnocnema
- Species: L. emperamus

Binomial name
- Lachnocnema emperamus (Snellen, 1872)

Synonyms
- Lycaena emperamus Snellen, 1872; Lachnocnema brimo Karsch, 1893; Lachnocnema sudanica Aurivillius, 1905; Lachnocnema obliquisigna Hulstaert, 1924; Lachnocnema rectifascia Hulstaert, 1924

= Lachnocnema emperamus =

Common woolly legs

Species of butterfly

Lachnocnema emperamus, the common woolly legs or western woolly legs, is a butterfly in the family Lycaenidae. It is found in Senegal, the Gambia, Guinea, Sierra Leone, Liberia, Ivory Coast, Ghana, Togo, Nigeria, Cameroon, Gabon, the Republic of the Congo, the Central African Republic, Angola, the Democratic Republic of the Congo, southern Sudan, Ethiopia, Uganda, and western and central Kenya. The habitat consists of savanna and degraded forests.

The larvae feed on Psyllidae species.
