= Lagenaria rufa =

Scientific classification
- Kingdom: Plantae
- Clade: Tracheophytes
- Clade: Angiosperms
- Clade: Eudicots
- Clade: Rosids
- Order: Cucurbitales
- Family: Cucurbitaceae
- Genus: Lagenaria
- Species: L. rufa

Binomial name
- Lagenaria rufa (Gilg) C.Jeffrey

Synonyms
- Adenopus rufus Gilg

Species of flowering plant

Lagenaria rufa is a flowering plant in the family Cucurbitaceae. It is a climbing vine. Its flowers range from white to yellow. The fruit is a gourd, dark green when developing but becomes cream-orange when ripe. It is native to Western Africa.
