= Lachnocnema triangularis =

Scientific classification
- Kingdom: Animalia
- Phylum: Arthropoda
- Class: Insecta
- Order: Lepidoptera
- Family: Lycaenidae
- Genus: Lachnocnema
- Species: L. triangularis

Binomial name
- Lachnocnema triangularis Libert, 1996

Species of butterfly

Lachnocnema triangularis is a butterfly in the family Lycaenidae. It is found in the Republic of the Congo, the eastern part of the Democratic Republic of the Congo and Uganda.
