= Friedrich Guimpel =

German engraver and botanical illustrator

Friedrich Guimpel (1 August 1774 in Berlin – 17 January 1839) was a German engraver and botanical illustrator.

An artist and professor at the Berlin Academy of Arts, he collaborated with several renowned botanists in the creation of illustrated botanical works.

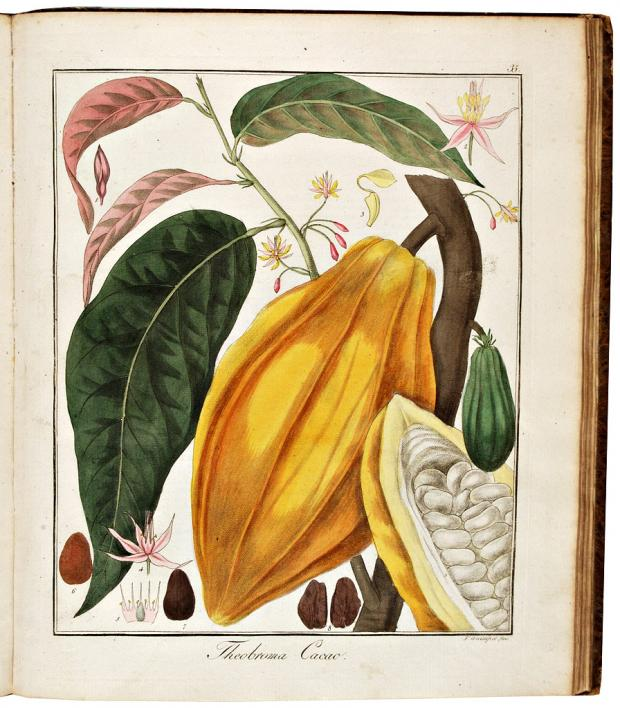
Botanical plate of Theobroma cacao by Friedrich Guimpel from Hayne's "Getreue Darstellung und Beschreibung der in der Arzneykunde gebräuchlichen Gewächse".

The species Berberis guimpelii was named in his honor by Karl Koch and Carl David Bouché. It is synonymous with Berberis chinensis.

Lesser known is that Friedrich Guimpel also illustrated in colors a least one medical book: Carl Heinrich Weller Die Krankheiten des menschlichen Auges (Berlin 1819) and also the second edition of the same work in 1822.

== Selected works ==
- Abbildung der deutschen holzarten für forstmäner und liebhaber der botanik, 1815 – 1820 (with Friedrich Gottlob Hayne; Karl Ludwig Willdenow) – Illustrations of German wood species for foresters and lovers of botany.
- Abbildung der fremden, in Deutschland ausdauernden holzarten für forstmänner, garten besitzer und für freunde der botanik, 1825 (with Friedrich Gottlob Hayne; Christoph Friedrich Otto).
- Abbildung und Beschreibung aller in der Pharmacopoea Borussica aufgeführten Gewächse, (with Diederich Franz Leonhard von Schlechtendal) – Illustrations and descriptions of everything in the Pharmacopoeia Borussica listing of plants.
- Pflanzen-Abbildungen und Beschreibungen zur Erkenntniss officineller Gewächse, 1838 (with Johann Friedrich Klotzsch) – Botanical illustrations and descriptions of officinal plants.
