= Lippia substrigosa =

Scientific classification
- Kingdom: Plantae
- Clade: Tracheophytes
- Clade: Angiosperms
- Clade: Eudicots
- Clade: Asterids
- Order: Lamiales
- Family: Verbenaceae
- Genus: Lippia
- Species: L. substrigosa

Binomial name
- Lippia substrigosa Turcz.

Species of shrub

Lippia substrigosa is a plant from the family Verbenaceae that is native to Central and South America. It can grow as either a shrub or a tree up to 7 metres (23 ft) tall and can be burned to produce fuel. Its essential oil may have pharmaceutical or cosmetic uses.

== Distribution ==
Lippia substrigosa is native to southern Mexico, Guatemala, Honduras, El Salvador, and Nicaragua. In Guatemala, L. substrigosa can be found in the departments of Alta Verapaz, Baja Verapaz, Chimaltenango, Chiquimula, Guatemala, Huehuetenango, Jalapa, Quetzaltenango, El Quiche, Sacatepéquez, San Marcos, Santa Rosa, Sololá, and Zacapa.

== Habitat and ecology ==
Lippia substrigosa is able to grow in diverse habitats. It has been found at altitudes from 1,200 to 2,800 metres (3,900 to 9,200 ft) and can grow in oak-pine forests, open rocky slopes, and in wet or dry thickets.

== Morphology ==
Individuals of this species are either trees or shrubs that can grow to a height of 7 metres (23 ft). The branches of an individual plant of this species are usually densely packed with sticky hairs. The hairs themselves may be harsh, brownish spreading hairs that are sometimes long and soft, or pale spreading hairs. The leaf petioles are 0.7 to 3 centimetres (0.28 to 1.18 in) long.

The leaf blades are ovate to broadly ovate or ovate-elliptic. They typically range in size from 5 to 24 centimetres (2.0 to 9.4 in) long and 2.5 to 12 centimetres (0.98 to 4.72 in) wide. At their tips, leaf blades are acute to acuminate (tapering to a sharp point), while at their base, they are either cordate to abruptly contracted and obtuse or long, slender and wedge shaped. The surface of the leaf blade is puckered with a blistery appearance or is wrinkly and rugged. The leaf blade feels rough to the touch and has hairs that may be soft, weak, thin and clearly separated or coarse, rough, long and densely matted. The edges of the leaf are toothed, and may be crenate (with rounded edges), or serrate (with jagged edges).

An individual plant of L. substrigosa typically has four to eight peduncles in each leaf axil. They tend to be 2.5 to 6 centimetres (0.98 to 2.36 in) long and are covered with long, rough, and coarse hairs. Pubescent hairs, arising from glands, also grow on the peduncle.

The flower of an individual of this species is arranged in a subglobose shape, meaning it is somewhat, but not exactly, spherical. At the time of flowering, or anthesis, the flower is 10 to 20 millimetres (0.39 to 0.79 in) long and 10 to 16 millimetres (0.39 to 0.63 in) wide. The corolla of the flower is 4 mm to 6 mm long and is pale yellow. Below the corolla, the calyx is 2 mm to 2.5 mm long and is covered with long, soft and weak hairs that are somewhat dense. In addition to the sepals of the calyx, L. substrigosa also has bracts that are broadly ovate to kidney-shaped. At their apex, the bracts are either rounded or acute and taper to a sharp firm point. The lower bracts can sometimes grow to become 14 millimetres (0.55 in) long. Bracts may have long, erect and rigid hairs or short, soft and erect hairs that are confined to glands.

== Flowers and fruit ==
Flowers of L. substrigosa have stamens that are didynamous, meaning they come in two pairs of unequal length. These four stamens only protrude slightly from the flower and are located near the middle of the corolla tube. The anthers of the stamen are not appendages and appear to have an ovate shape. The cells of the anther are parallel to one another.

Individual plants of this species have ovaries with two chambers, each of which contains one ovule. The ovules are located near the base of the flower and are erect, or they are attached horizontally near the base. The style (the structure that connects the ovary to the stigma) is terminal. The stigma can be asymmetrical, bent backwards or downwards, or consist of two lobes.

The flowers of this species produce fruits that are dry and small. These fruits are also usually found near the calyx. The fruit's pericarp is hard and dry and the seeds do not have an endosperm. When these fruits mature, they separate into two pyrenas, or seeds surrounded by hardened endocarp.

== Usage ==
Not many uses have, as yet, been discovered for L. substrigosa yet. However, it may be burned for fuel and research is being conducted to determine the potential benefits of its essential oil. Many other plants of the genus Lippia have also been found to produce essential oils. In fact, Lippia alba, Lippia dulcis, and Lippia gravolens are used in traditional medicine in Guatemala. The latter two Lippia species have been used to treat colds, coughs, asthma and bronchitis. L. substrigosa has a high concentration of various sesquiterpenes, some of which are found frequently in the oils of other Lippia species. Therefore, although the essential oils of Lippia species vary from each other in concentration and composition of chemical compounds, L. substrigosa may produce an oil that has medicinal benefit or a cosmetic use due to genetic similarities among species in the genus Lippia.
