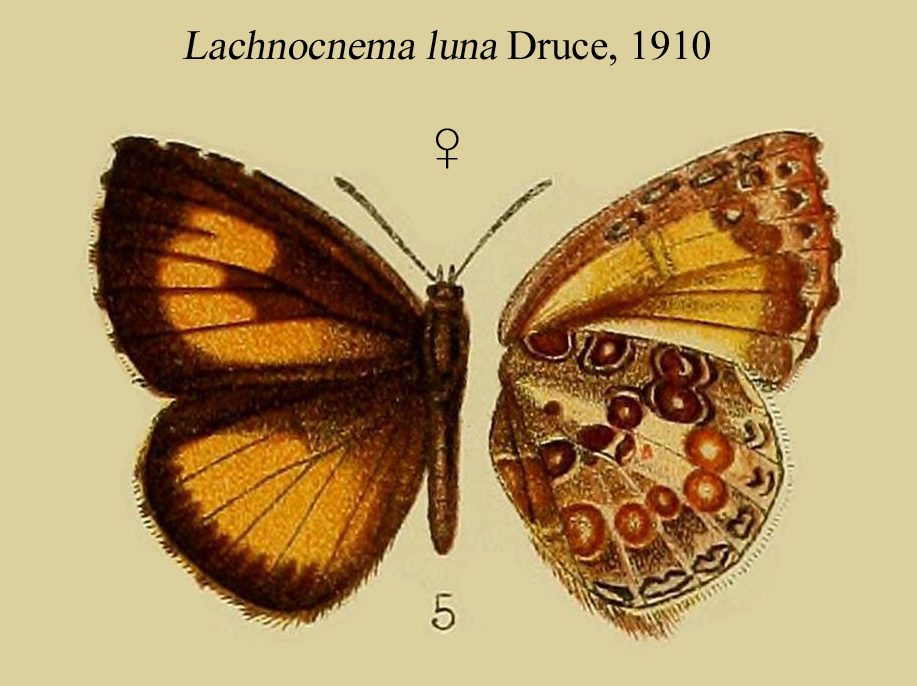
- Lachnocnema luna female

Scientific classification
- Kingdom: Animalia
- Phylum: Arthropoda
- Clade: Pancrustacea
- Class: Insecta
- Order: Lepidoptera
- Family: Lycaenidae
- Subfamily: Miletinae
- Tribe: Lachnocnemini
- Genus: Lachnocnema; Trimen, 1887

Species
- See text

= Lachnocnema =

Butterfly genus in family Lycaenidae

Lachnocnema, commonly called woolly legs, is a genus of butterflies in the family Lycaenidae found mainly in Sub-Saharan Africa. Identification requires dissection to reveal subtle genital distinctions.

== Species ==
Listed alphabetically within species groups:

- Lachnocnema bibulus group
  - Lachnocnema bibulus (Fabricius, 1793) – common woolly legs
  - Lachnocnema kiellandi Libert, 1996
  - Lachnocnema laches (Fabricius, 1793) – southern pied woolly legs
  - Lachnocnema pseudobibulus Libert, 1996
  - Lachnocnema riftensis Libert, 1996
  - Lachnocnema sosia Libert, 1996
- Lachnocnema durbani group
  - Lachnocnema durbani Trimen, 1887 – D'Urban's woolly legs
  - Lachnocnema intermedia Libert, 1996
  - Lachnocnema tanzaniensis Libert, 1996
- Lachnocnema abyssinica group
  - Lachnocnema abyssinica Libert, 1996
  - Lachnocnema angolanus Libert, 1996
  - Lachnocnema ducarmei Libert, 1996
  - Lachnocnema triangularis Libert, 1996
- Lachnocnema jacksoni group
  - Lachnocnema jacksoni Stempffer, 1967
- Lachnocnema emperamus group
  - Lachnocnema bamptoni Libert, 1996
  - Lachnocnema brimoides Libert, 1996
  - Lachnocnema divergens Gaede, 1915 – divergent woolly legs
  - Lachnocnema dohertyi Libert, 1996
  - Lachnocnema emperamus (Snellen, 1872) – common woolly legs or western woolly legs
  - Lachnocnema katangae Libert, 1996
  - Lachnocnema obscura Libert, 1996
  - Lachnocnema overlaeti Libert, 1996
  - Lachnocnema regularis (Libert, 1996) – regular woolly legs
  - Lachnocnema vuattouxi Libert, 1996 – western woolly legs
- Lachnocnema reutlingeri group
  - Lachnocnema albimacula Libert, 1996 - Libert's large woolly legs
  - Lachnocnema brunea Libert, 1996
  - Lachnocnema jolyana Libert, 1996
  - Lachnocnema luna Druce, 1910 – Druce's large woolly legs
  - Lachnocnema magna Aurivillius, 1895 – large woolly legs
  - Lachnocnema nigrocellularis Libert, 1996
  - Lachnocnema reutlingeri Holland, 1892 – Reutlinger's large woolly legs
- Lachnocnema exiguus group
  - Lachnocnema exiguus Holland, 1890 – white woolly legs
- Species group unknown
  - Lachnocnema congoensis Libert, 1996
  - Lachnocnema disrupta Talbot, 1935 – toothed white woolly legs
  - Lachnocnema inexpectata Libert, 1996
  - Lachnocnema unicolor Libert, 1996

The male and female of a potentially new species is illustrated in A Sharp Eye on Butterflies of Ghana.
