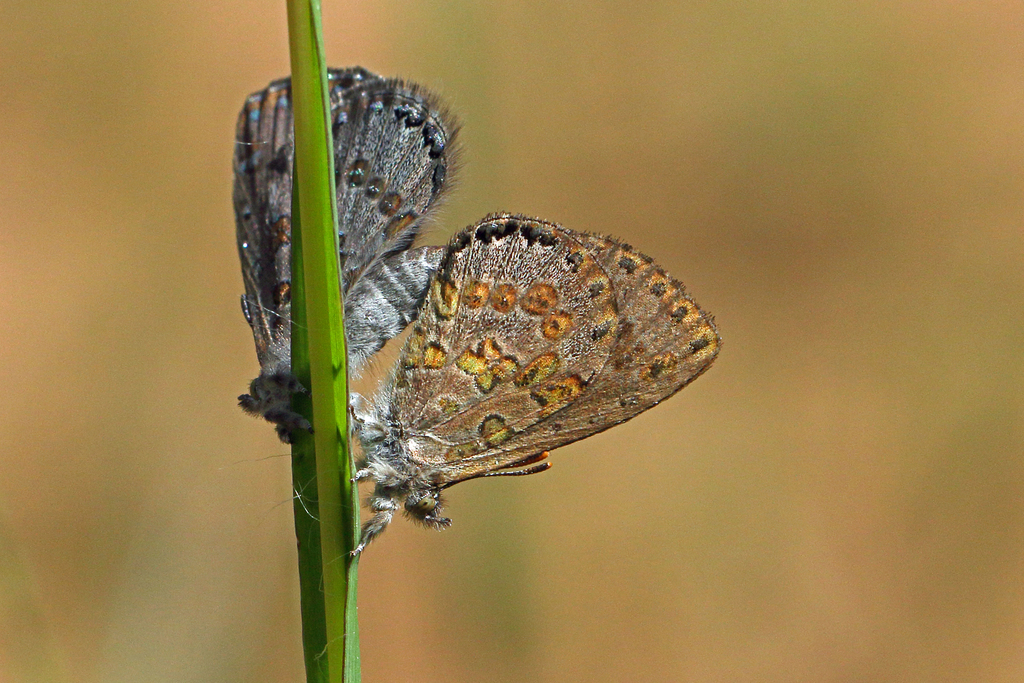

Scientific classification
- Kingdom: Animalia
- Phylum: Arthropoda
- Class: Insecta
- Order: Lepidoptera
- Family: Lycaenidae
- Genus: Lachnocnema
- Species: L. intermedia

Binomial name
- Lachnocnema intermedia Libert, 1996

= Lachnocnema intermedia =

Species of butterfly

Lachnocnema intermedia is a butterfly in the family Lycaenidae. It is found in Angola, the Democratic Republic of the Congo and north-western Zambia.
