= Hernandulcin =

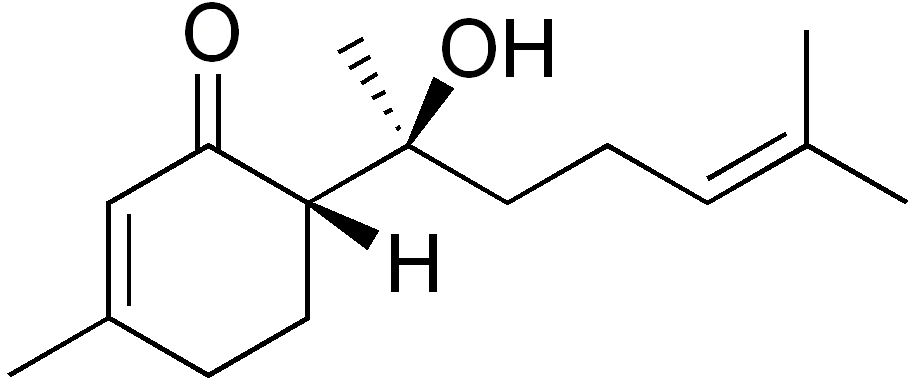

Names
- Preferred IUPAC name (6S)-6-[(2S)-2-Hydroxy-6-methylhept-5-en-2-yl]-3-methylcyclohex-2-en-1-one

Identifiers
CAS Number	95602-94-1
3D model (JSmol)	Interactive image
ChemSpider	111731
PubChem CID	125608
UNII	7V22TJL7NX
CompTox Dashboard (EPA)	DTXSID30905099
- InChI: InChI=1S/C15H24O2/c1-11(2)6-5-9-15(4,17)13-8-7-12(3)10-14(13)16/h6,10,13,17H,5,7-9H2,1-4H3/t13-,15+/m1/s1 Key: HYQNKKAJVPMBDR-HIFRSBDPSA-N; InChI=1/C15H24O2/c1-11(2)6-5-9-15(4,17)13-8-7-12(3)10-14(13)16/h6,10,13,17H,5,7-9H2,1-4H3/t13-,15+/m1/s1 Key: HYQNKKAJVPMBDR-HIFRSBDPBM
- SMILES: CC1=CC(=O)[C@@H](CC1)[C@](C)(CCC=C(C)C)O

Properties
Chemical formula	C_{15}H_{24}O_{2}
Molar mass	236.35 g/mol
- Except where otherwise noted, data are given for materials in their standard state (at 25 °C [77 °F], 100 kPa). verify (what is ?) Infobox references

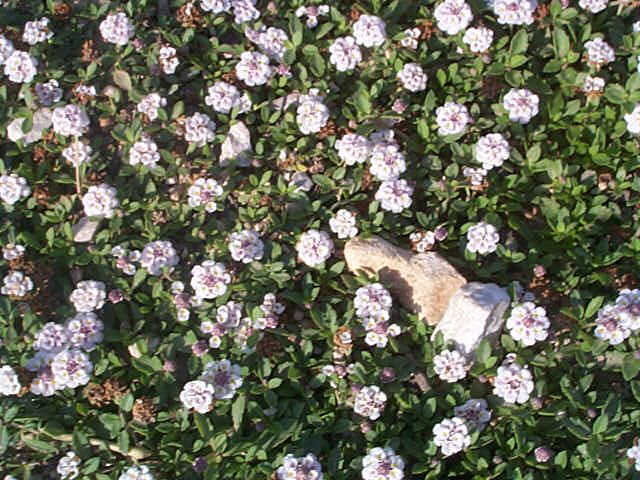
The Phyla dulcis plant, which naturally produces hernandulcin.

Hernandulcin is an intensely sweet chemical compound gained from the chiefly Mexican and South American plant Lippia dulcis.

== History and origin ==
In the 1570s, Spanish physician Francisco Hernández described a remarkably sweet plant known to the Aztecs as Tzonpelic xihuitl, meaning "sweet herb". This reference, accompanied by an accurate description and illustration of the plant, led to a group of pharmacognocists in 1985 to a previously unrecognised, intensely sweet chemical that can provide sweetness without tooth decay. Cesar M. Compadre, and A. Douglas Kinghorn, from the University of Illinois at Chicago isolated and identified the sweet compound from the leaves and flowers of the Lippia dulcis plant, in Mexico. The researchers noted the chemical structure of the colourless oil, and named it hernandulcin after Francisco Hernandez.

== Structure ==
Hernandulcin is a sesquiterpene with the molecular formula C_{15}H_{24}O_{2}. By slightly modifying the compound, researchers have identified the three parts of the chemical structure that produced the intense sweet taste—the carbonyl group, the hydroxyl group, and the hydrophobic side chain. Hernandulcin was the first sesquiterpene found to be sweet, and after a panel of volunteers tasted hernandulcin, it was determined that it was more than 1,000 times sweeter than sugar. Hernandulcin also has a minty aftertaste, and does not cause tooth decay, which would make it a good candidate for oral hygiene products.
