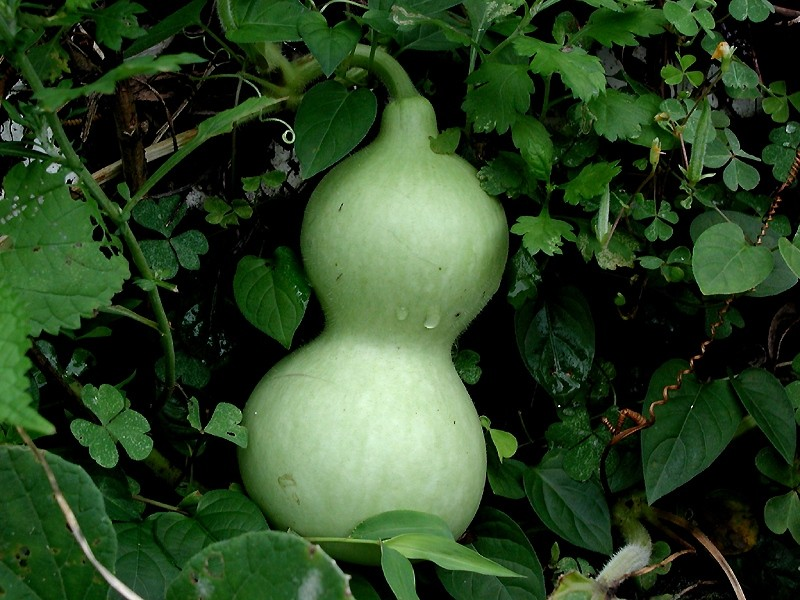
- The calabash (L. siceraria)

Scientific classification
- Kingdom: Plantae
- Clade: Embryophytes
- Clade: Tracheophytes
- Clade: Angiosperms
- Clade: Eudicots
- Clade: Rosids
- Order: Cucurbitales
- Family: Cucurbitaceae
- Subfamily: Cucurbitoideae
- Tribe: Benincaseae
- Genus: Lagenaria; Ser.

Synonyms
- Adenopus Benth.; Sphaerosicyos Hook.f.

= Lagenaria =

Genus of flowering plants

Lagenaria is a genus of gourd-bearing vines in the squash family (Cucurbitaceae). Lagenaria contains six species, all of which are indigenous to tropical Africa. The best-known species, the calabash or bottle gourd, L. siceraria, has been domesticated by humans, and has spread beyond Africa. The other species are not cultivated. The gourds of the various species may be harvested young and used as a vegetable. More commonly, the gourds are harvested mature, then dried, and used in making utensils (including musical instruments and containers). Gourds of L. siceraria have been used to store water and other liquids since ancient times. The generic name lagenaria comes from classical Latin lagena meaning bottle or flask, plus Latin suffix -aria.

== Species ==
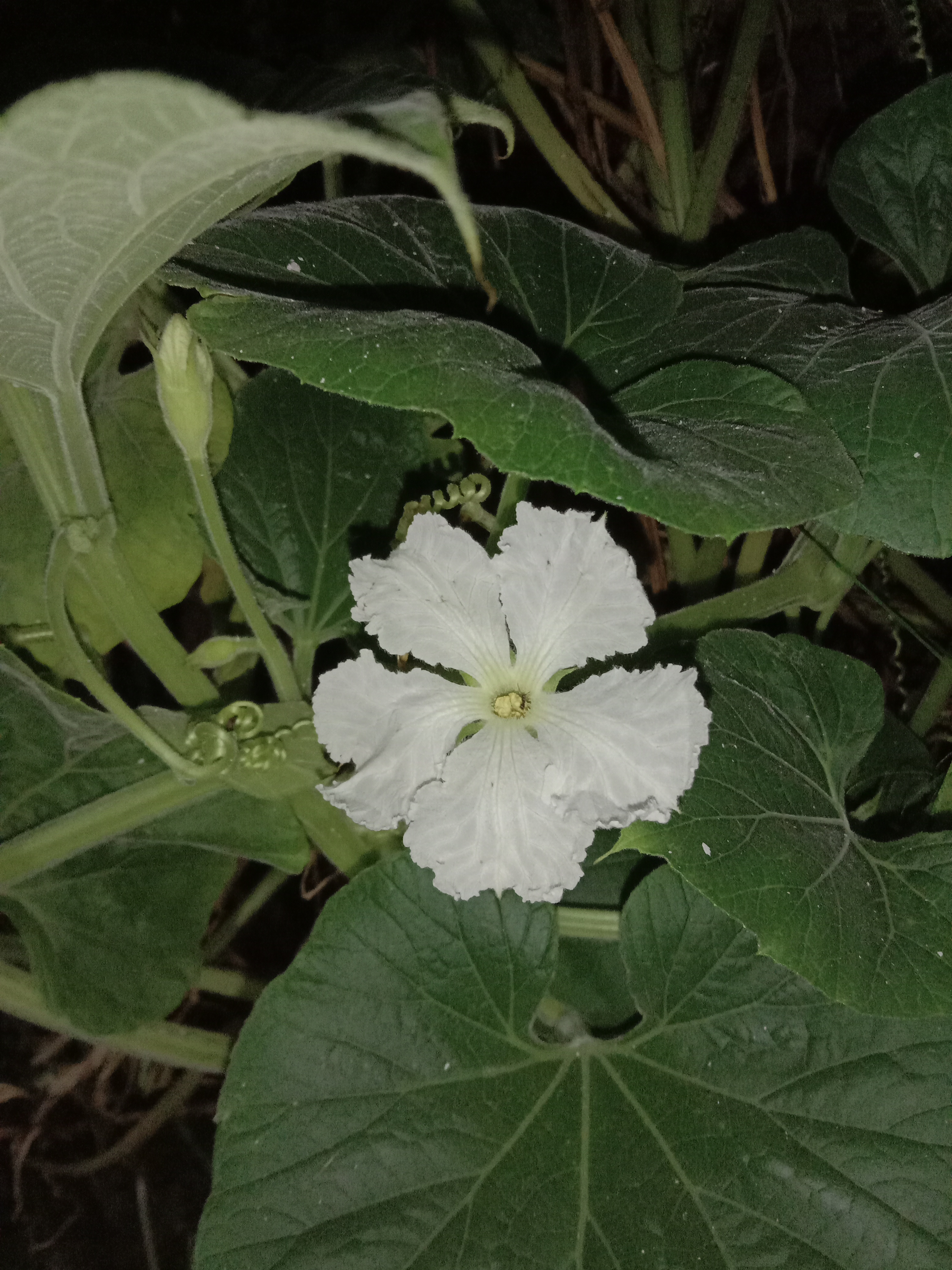
Flower of Lagenaria captured at night

The genus comprises 6 species:

- Lagenaria abyssinica
- Lagenaria breviflora
- Lagenaria guineensis
- Lagenaria rufa
- Lagenaria siceraria
- Lagenaria sphaerica
