= Lachnocnema albimacula =

Libert's large woolly legs

Scientific classification
- Kingdom: Animalia
- Phylum: Arthropoda
- Clade: Pancrustacea
- Class: Insecta
- Order: Lepidoptera
- Family: Lycaenidae
- Genus: Lachnocnema
- Species: L. albimacula

Binomial name
- Lachnocnema albimacula Libert, 1996

Species of butterfly

Lachnocnema albimacula, the Libert's large woolly legs, is a butterfly in the family Lycaenidae. It is found in Ivory Coast, Ghana, Nigeria, Cameroon and the Republic of the Congo.

Torben Larsen developed a species numbering system for his 2005 publication Butterflies of West Africa. This species is #139. The 'Larsen' numbers have since been used with permission in A Sharp Eye on Butterflies of Ghana.
