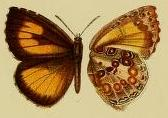

Scientific classification
- Kingdom: Animalia
- Phylum: Arthropoda
- Clade: Pancrustacea
- Class: Insecta
- Order: Lepidoptera
- Family: Lycaenidae
- Genus: Lachnocnema
- Species: L. luna

Binomial name
- Lachnocnema luna H. H. Druce, 1910

= Lachnocnema luna =

Druce's large woolly legs

Species of butterfly

Lachnocnema luna, or Druce's large woolly legs, is a butterfly in the family Lycaenidae. The species was first described by Hamilton Herbert Druce in 1910. It is found in Ghana (the Volta Region), eastern Nigeria, Cameroon, Gabon, the Republic of the Congo, the north-eastern part of the Democratic Republic of the Congo, Uganda and north-western Tanzania. The habitat consists of forests.

Larvae have been recorded on Cassia alata. They fed on the secretions of immature ant-attended membracids and jassids.

Torben Larsen developed a species numbering system for his 2005 publication Butterflies of West Africa. This species is #137. The 'Larsen' numbers have since been used with permission in A Sharp Eye on Butterflies of Ghana.
