= Lippia palmeri =

Scientific classification
- Kingdom: Plantae
- Clade: Tracheophytes
- Clade: Angiosperms
- Clade: Eudicots
- Clade: Asterids
- Order: Lamiales
- Family: Verbenaceae
- Genus: Lippia
- Species: L. palmeri

Binomial name
- Lippia palmeri S.Watson

Species of shrub

Lippia palmeri is a species of flowering plant in the verbena family, Verbenaceae. It is native to the Sonoran Desert.

It is a tall slender shrub, reaching 2 metres in height and spreading to 1 metre. Fragrant white flowers can be found on the plant after the rains.

== Uses ==
The Seri call the shrub xomcahiift and use the leaves as a culinary herb. Medicinally Seri use an infusion of the leaves applied topically to kill head lice.
