= Lachnocnema brimoides =

Scientific classification
- Kingdom: Animalia
- Phylum: Arthropoda
- Class: Insecta
- Order: Lepidoptera
- Family: Lycaenidae
- Genus: Lachnocnema
- Species: L. brimoides

Binomial name
- Lachnocnema brimoides Libert, 1996

Species of butterfly

Lachnocnema brimoides is a butterfly in the family Lycaenidae. It is found in western Tanzania, Malawi (Mount Mlanje), Zambia, the eastern highlands of Zimbabwe and Mozambique.
