= Lachnocnema pseudobibulus =

Scientific classification
- Kingdom: Animalia
- Phylum: Arthropoda
- Class: Insecta
- Order: Lepidoptera
- Family: Lycaenidae
- Genus: Lachnocnema
- Species: L. pseudobibulus

Binomial name
- Lachnocnema pseudobibulus Libert, 1996

Species of butterfly

Lachnocnema pseudobibulus is a butterfly in the family Lycaenidae. It is found in Uganda, Kenya, Tanzania, the Democratic Republic of the Congo, Malawi and Zimbabwe.
