= Lachnocnema regularis =

Regular woolly legs

Scientific classification
- Kingdom: Animalia
- Phylum: Arthropoda
- Class: Insecta
- Order: Lepidoptera
- Family: Lycaenidae
- Genus: Lachnocnema
- Species: L. regularis

Binomial name
- Lachnocnema regularis Libert, 1996

Species of butterfly

Lachnocnema regularis, the regular woolly legs, is a butterfly of the family Lycaenidae. The nominate subspecies is only known from a single record in the Limpopo Province. Subspecies grisea is also found in Africa, including Tanzania.

The wingspan is 28–36 mm for males and 34–38 mm for females.

== Subspecies ==
- Lachnocnema regularis regularis (Angola, southern Democratic Republic of the Congo, Zambia, South Africa: Limpopo Province)
- Lachnocnema regularis grisea Libert, 1996 (western and southern Tanzania)
