= Ottoa =

Scientific classification
- Kingdom: Plantae
- Clade: Tracheophytes
- Clade: Angiosperms
- Clade: Eudicots
- Clade: Asterids
- Order: Apiales
- Family: Apiaceae
- Subfamily: Apioideae
- Tribe: Selineae
- Genus: Ottoa; Kunth
- Species: O. oenanthoides

Binomial name
- Ottoa oenanthoides Kunth

Synonyms
- Oenanthe quitensis Spreng.; Ottoa oenanthoides subvar. major Wedd.; Ottoa oenanthoides var. major (Wedd.) Mathias & Constance

Species of flowering plant

Ottoa is a monotypic genus of flowering plants belonging to the family Apiaceae. It only contains one known species, Ottoa oenanthoides.

Its native range is from southern Mexico to Venezuela and Ecuador. It is also found in Colombia, Costa Rica, Guatemala, and Panamá.

The genus name of Ottoa is in honour of Christoph Friedrich Otto (1783–1856), a German gardener and botanist. The Latin specific epithet of oenanthoides means one that resembles a member of the genus Oenanthe. Both the genus and the species were first described and published in F.W.H.von Humboldt, A.J.A.Bonpland & C.S.Kunth, Nov. Gen. Sp. Vol.5 on page 20 in 1821.

Essential oils have been extracted by hydrodistillation methods from leaves and roots of Otto.
