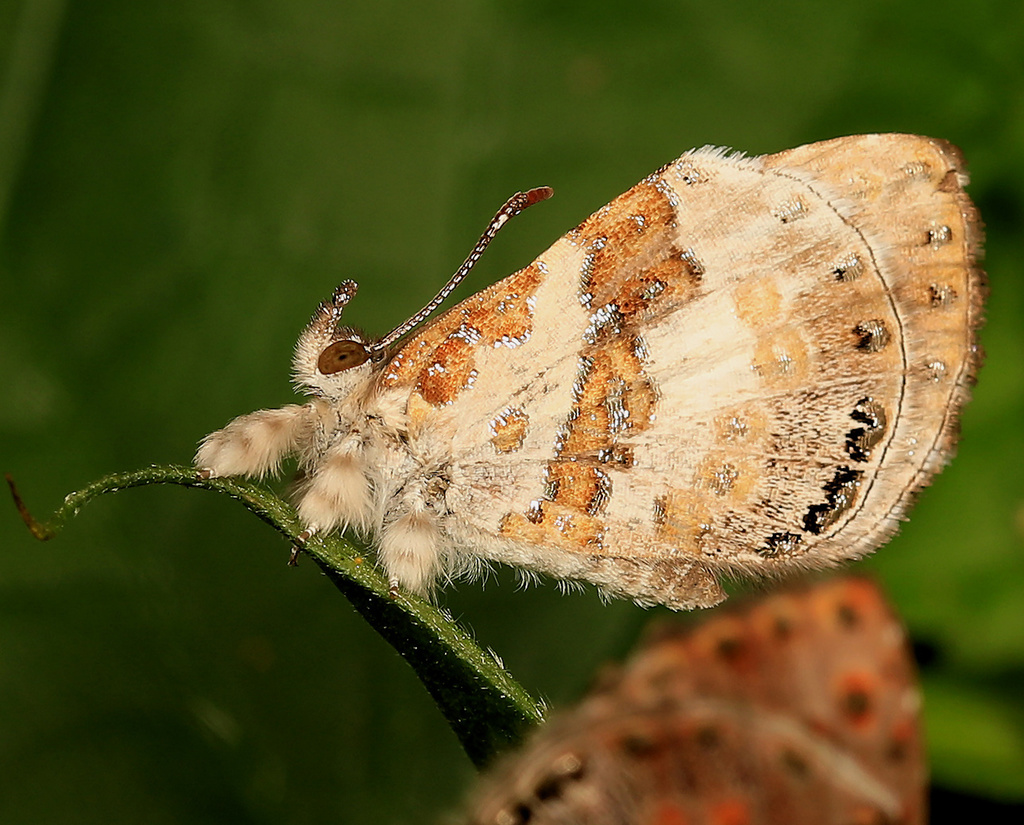

Scientific classification
- Kingdom: Animalia
- Phylum: Arthropoda
- Class: Insecta
- Order: Lepidoptera
- Family: Lycaenidae
- Genus: Lachnocnema
- Species: L. laches

Binomial name
- Lachnocnema laches (Fabricius, 1793)

Synonyms
- Hesperia laches Fabricius, 1793

= Lachnocnema laches =

Southern pied woolly legs

Species of butterfly

Lachnocnema laches, the southern pied woolly legs, is a butterfly of the family Lycaenidae. It is found in coastal forests from the East Cape, along the coast of KwaZulu-Natal, inland to Eswatini, Mpumalanga, the Limpopo Province, and the North West Province along wooded hills and valleys. The habitat consists of savanna.

The wingspan is 23–32 mm (0.91–1.26 in) for males and 22–32 mm (0.87–1.26 in) for females. Adults are on wing year-round in warmer areas with peaks in spring and late summer.
