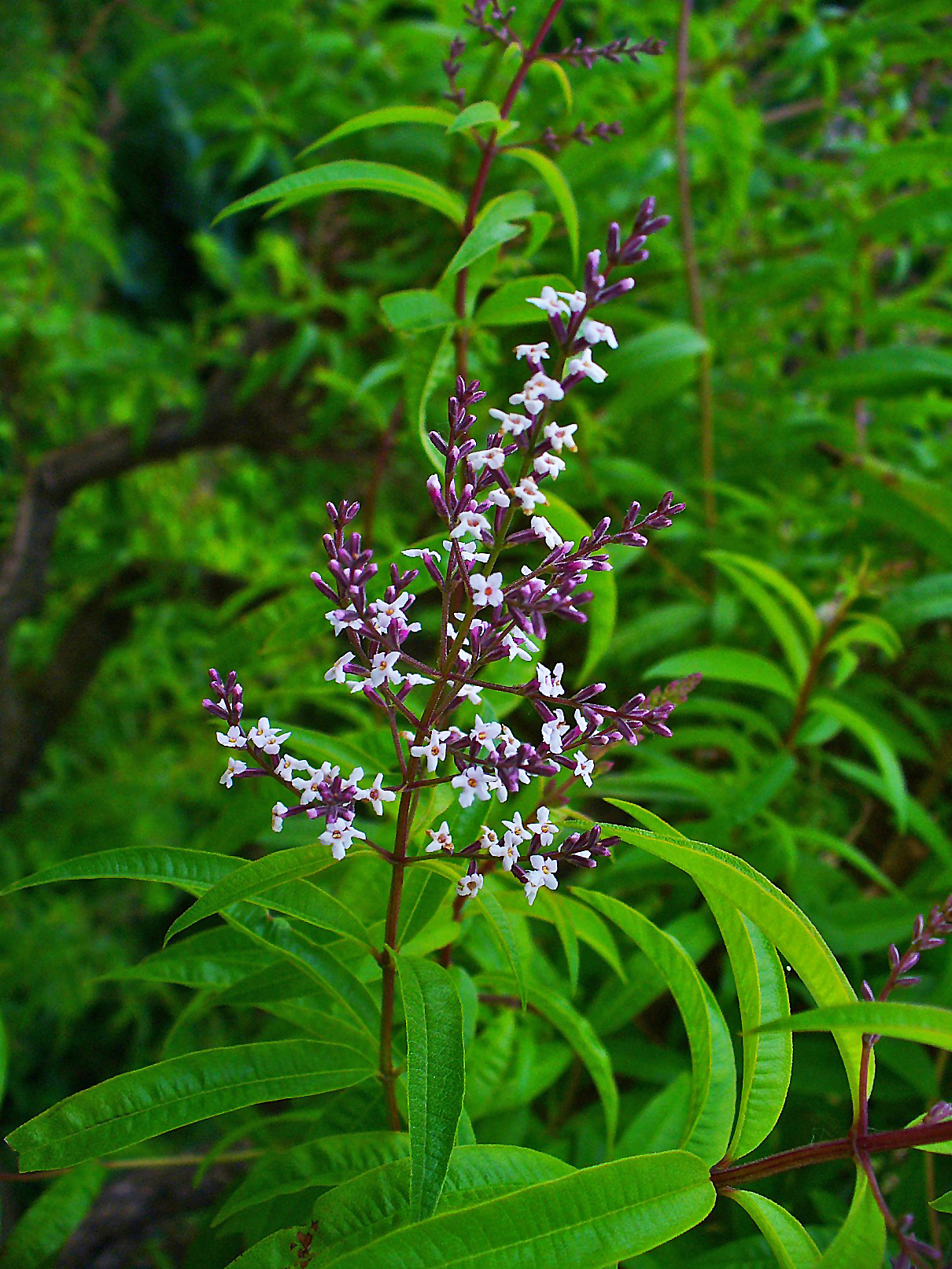

Scientific classification
- Kingdom: Plantae
- Clade: Tracheophytes
- Clade: Angiosperms
- Clade: Eudicots
- Clade: Asterids
- Order: Lamiales
- Family: Verbenaceae
- Genus: Aloysia
- Species: A. citrodora

Binomial name
- Aloysia citrodora Paláu

Synonyms
- Aloysia triphylla (L'Hér.) Britton; Lippia citriodora Kunth; Lippia triphylla (L'Hér.) Kuntze; Verbena triphylla L'Hér. Zappania citrodora Lam.

= Aloysia citrodora =

Species of plant

Aloysia citrodora, lemon verbena, is a species of flowering plant in the verbena family Verbenaceae, native to South America. Other common names include lemon beebrush. It was brought to Europe by the Spanish and the Portuguese in the 17th century and cultivated for its oil.

== Description ==
Lemon verbena is a perennial shrub or subshrub growing to 2–3 metres (7–10 ft) high. The 8-centimetre-long (3 in), glossy, pointed leaves are slightly rough to the touch and emit a strong lemon scent when bruised (hence the Latin specific epithet citrodora—lemon-scented).

Sprays of tiny purple or white flowers appear in late spring or early summer, although potted lemon verbenas may not flower. It is evergreen in tropical locations, but is sensitive to cold, losing leaves at temperatures below 0 °C (32 °F), although the wood is hardy to −10 °C (14 °F). Pruning is recommended in spring to encourage a bushy form. Due to its many culinary uses, it is widely listed and marketed as a plant for the herb garden. Researchers have identified anxiolytic effects in rat models.

== Uses ==
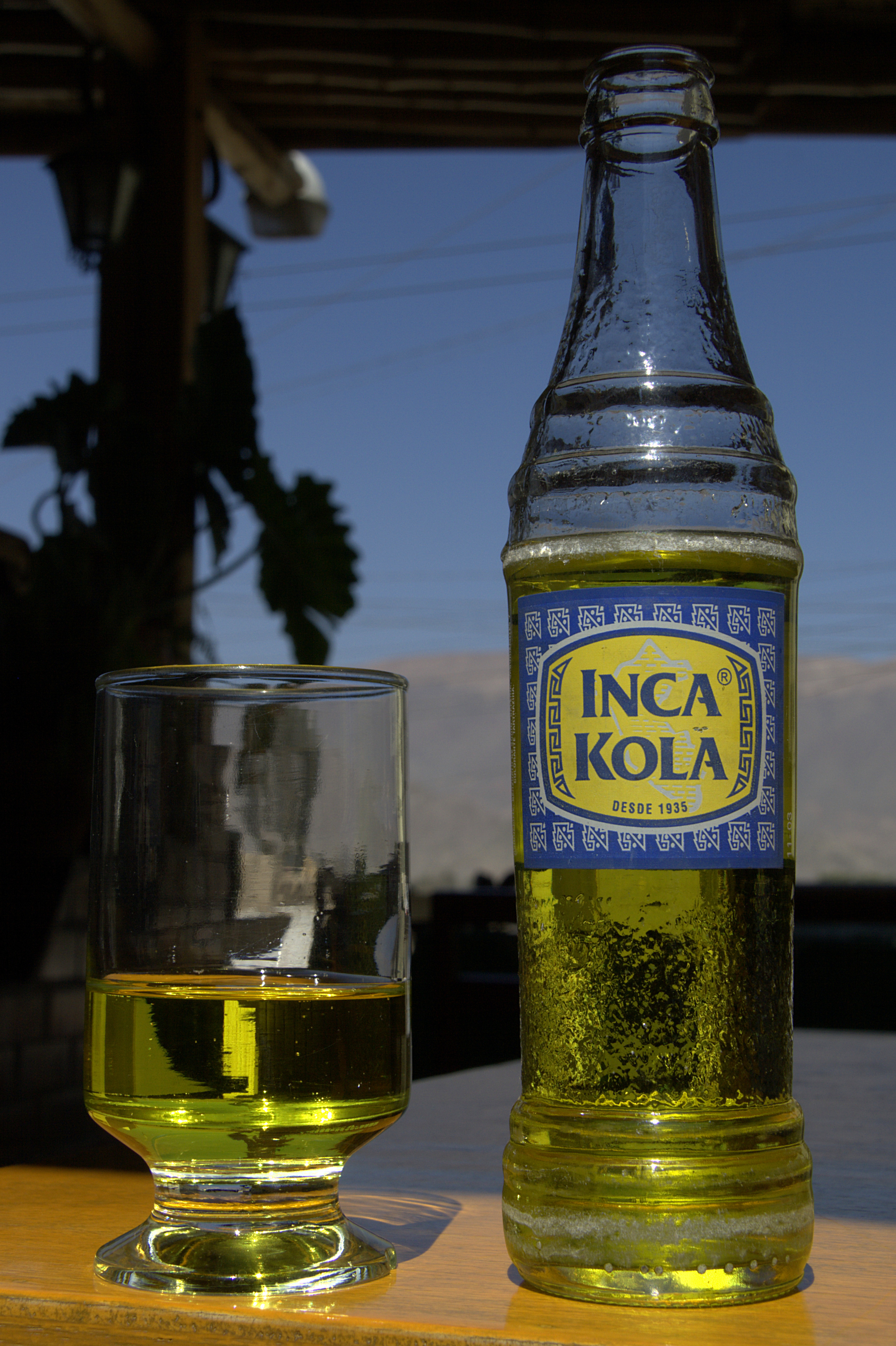
Inca Kola soft drink, which is flavored with lemon verbena.

Lemon verbena leaves are used to add a lemon flavor to fish and poultry dishes, vegetable marinades, salad dressings, jams, puddings, Greek yogurt, and beverages. The leaves are also used in potpourri. Lemon verbena is used to make herbal teas and as a liqueur flavoring. It is used in traditional medicine in Latin American countries. The oil was historically steam-distilled from the leaves for use in the perfume industry, but it has skin-sensitising and phototoxic properties. In the European Union, verbena essential oils (Lippia citriodora Kunth.) and derivatives other than absolute are prohibited when used as a fragrance ingredient (Regulation No. 1223/2009, Annex II).

== Chemistry ==
The major isolates in lemon verbena oil are citral (30–35%), nerol, and geraniol. Extracts of lemon verbena also contain verbascoside, an antimicrobial. As the plant has several phytochemicals which may act as substrates for drug-metabolizing enzymes, lemon verbena may cause herb-drug interactions. However, lemon verbena oil is generally recognized as safe (GRAS) by the US Food and Drug Administration when used as a flavoring.

== Synonyms ==
Synonyms for lemon verbena are Verbena triphylla L'Hér., Verbena citriodora Cav., Lippia triphylla, and Lippia citriodora.

== Garden history ==
The first European botanist who publicly noticed this plant was the French Philibert Commerson, who collected it in Buenos Aires on his botanical circumnavigation with Bougainville, about 1767. The plant had already been imported directly into the Real Jardín Botánico de Madrid, where in 1797 professors Casimiro Gómez Ortega and Antonio Palau y Verdera named it, though they did not yet effectively publish it, Aloysia citriodora in Latin and "Hierba de la Princesa" in Spanish, to compliment Maria Louisa of Parma, Princess of Asturias the wife of the Garden's patron Infante Carlos de Borbon, Prince of Asturias and son of king Carlos III. The name was later effectively published in the first volume of Palau's Parte Práctica de Botánica in 1784.

Unofficial importations from Spanish America seldom fared well: when another French botanist Joseph Dombey landed his collections at Cádiz in 1785, the plants were impounded and left to rot in warehouses, while Dombey was refused permission even to have seeds planted. Among the bare handful of plants Dombey had assembled during eight years at Lima, lemon verbena survived. Gómez Ortega sent seeds and specimens of the plant to Charles Louis L'Héritier de Brutelle in Paris; L'Héritier published it as Verbena triphylla in his Stirpes Novae, published in December 1785 or January 1786. From Paris John Sibthorp, professor of botany at Oxford, obtained the specimen that he introduced to British horticulture: by 1797 lemon verbena was common in greenhouses around London, and its popularity as essential in a fragrant bouquet increased through the following century.

This plant has gained the Royal Horticultural Society's Award of Garden Merit.
