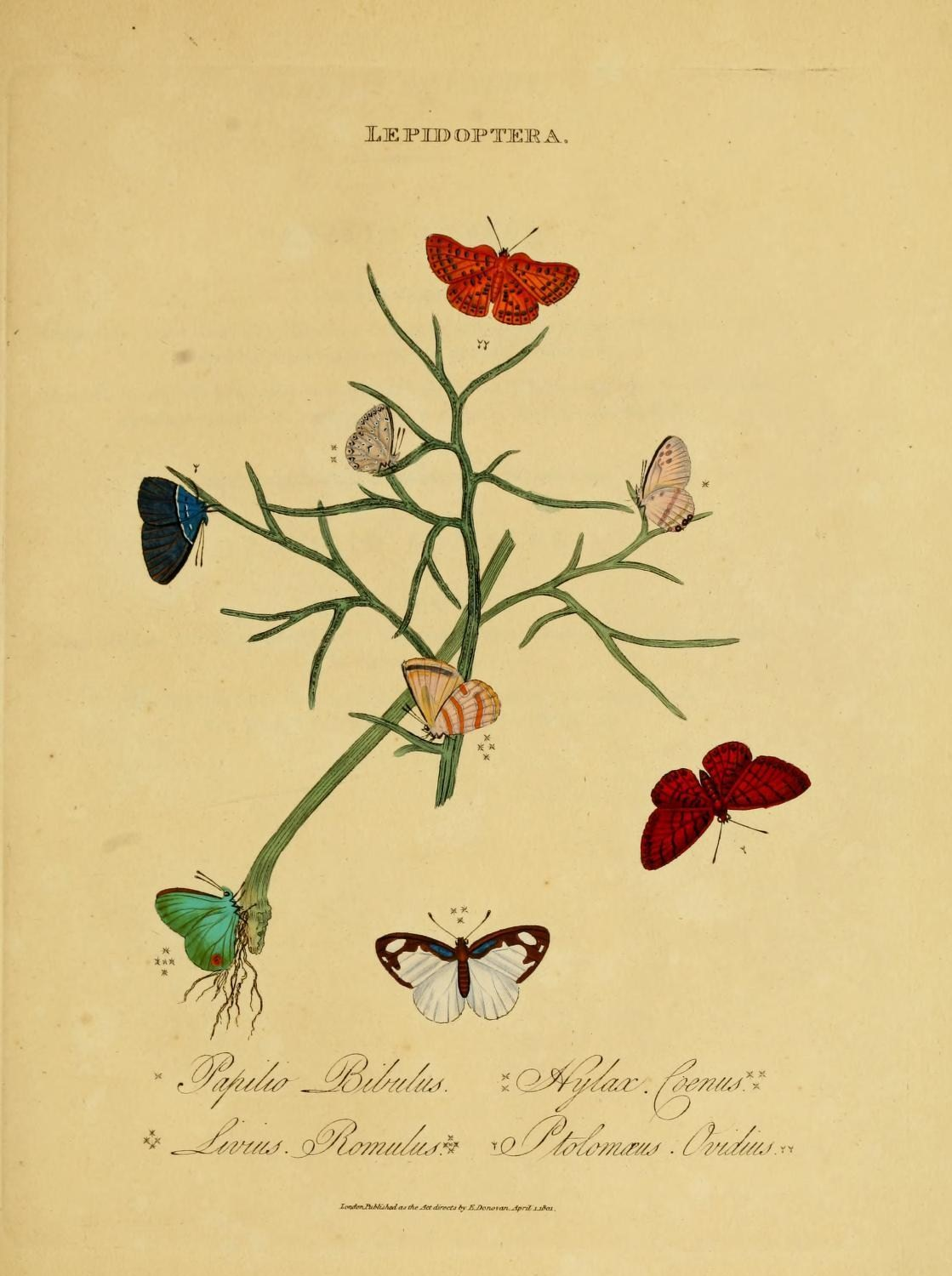

Scientific classification
- Kingdom: Animalia
- Phylum: Arthropoda
- Class: Insecta
- Order: Lepidoptera
- Family: Lycaenidae
- Genus: Lachnocnema
- Species: L. bibulus

Binomial name
- Lachnocnema bibulus (Fabricius, 1793)

Synonyms
- Hesperia bibulus Fabricius, 1793; Lycaena delegorguei Boisduval, 1847

= Lachnocnema bibulus =

Common woolly legs

Species of butterfly

Lachnocnema bibulus, the common woolly legs, is a butterfly of the family Lycaenidae. It is found in Sub-Saharan Africa. In South Africa it is found from the East Cape to KwaZulu-Natal, Eswatini, Mpumalanga, Gauteng, the Limpopo Province, and the North West Province.

The wingspan is 21–27 mm for males and 21–30.5 mm for females. Adults are on wing year-round in warmer areas with peaks in spring and late summer.

The larvae feed on Psyllidae plant lice species.
