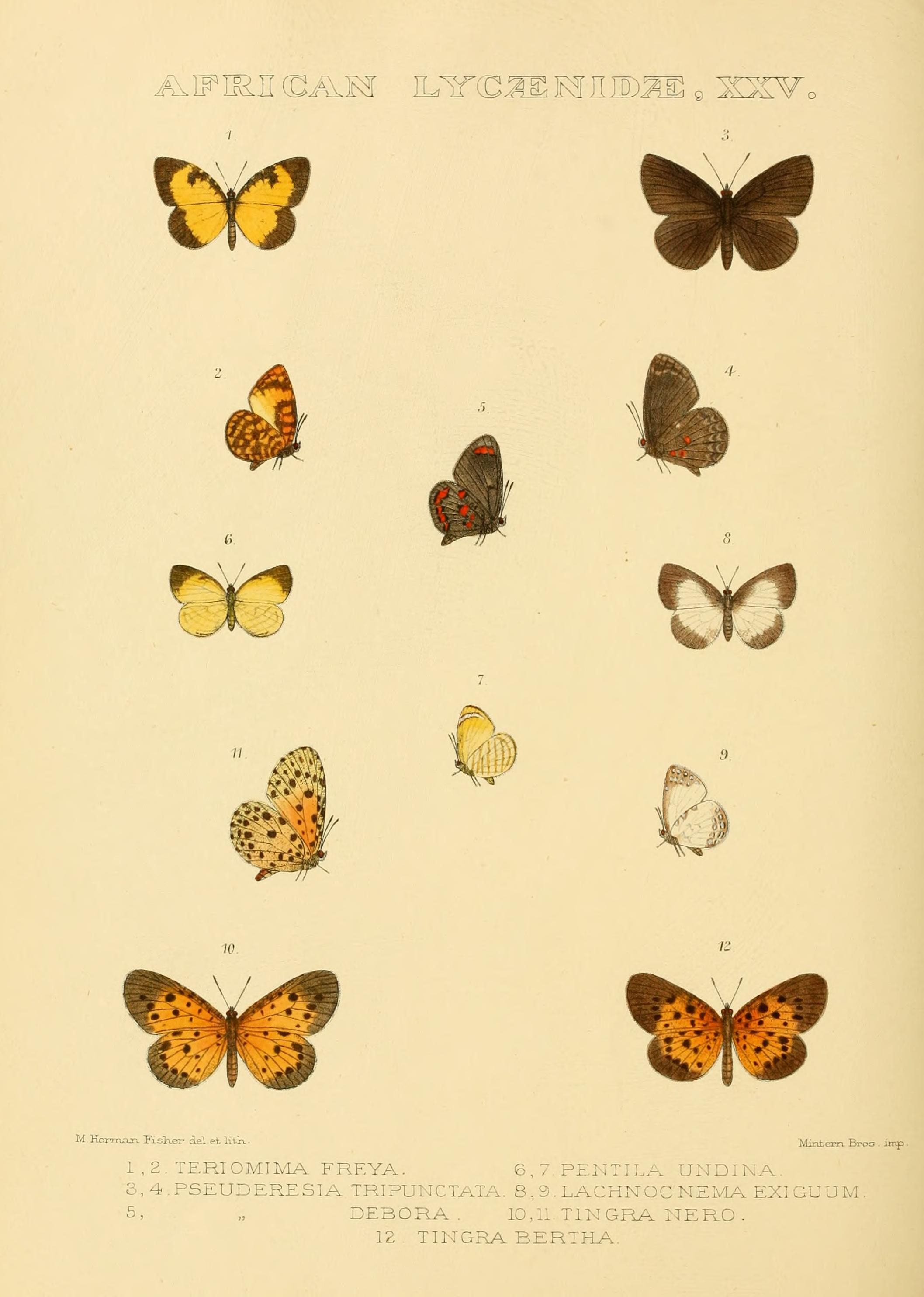
- Figures 8 and 9

Scientific classification
- Kingdom: Animalia
- Phylum: Arthropoda
- Class: Insecta
- Order: Lepidoptera
- Family: Lycaenidae
- Genus: Lachnocnema
- Species: L. exiguus

Binomial name
- Lachnocnema exiguus Holland, 1890

= Lachnocnema exiguus =

White woolly legs

Species of butterfly

Lachnocnema exiguus, the white woolly legs, is a butterfly in the family Lycaenidae. It is found in eastern Nigeria, Cameroon, Gabon, the Republic of the Congo, the north-eastern part of the Democratic Republic of the Congo, Uganda, and north-western Tanzania.
