= Lachnocnema angolanus =

Scientific classification
- Kingdom: Animalia
- Phylum: Arthropoda
- Class: Insecta
- Order: Lepidoptera
- Family: Lycaenidae
- Genus: Lachnocnema
- Species: L. angolanus

Binomial name
- Lachnocnema angolanus Libert, 1996

Species of butterfly

Lachnocnema angolanus is a butterfly in the family Lycaenidae. It is found in Angola.
