= Lachnocnema katangae =

Scientific classification
- Kingdom: Animalia
- Phylum: Arthropoda
- Class: Insecta
- Order: Lepidoptera
- Family: Lycaenidae
- Genus: Lachnocnema
- Species: L. katangae

Binomial name
- Lachnocnema katangae Libert, 1996

Species of butterfly

Lachnocnema katangae is a butterfly in the family Lycaenidae. It is found in the south-eastern part of the Democratic Republic of the Congo.
