= Lachnocnema overlaeti =

Scientific classification
- Kingdom: Animalia
- Phylum: Arthropoda
- Class: Insecta
- Order: Lepidoptera
- Family: Lycaenidae
- Genus: Lachnocnema
- Species: L. overlaeti

Binomial name
- Lachnocnema overlaeti Libert, 1996

Species of butterfly

Lachnocnema overlaeti is a butterfly in the family Lycaenidae. It is found in the Democratic Republic of the Congo.
