= Lachnocnema jolyana =

Scientific classification
- Kingdom: Animalia
- Phylum: Arthropoda
- Class: Insecta
- Order: Lepidoptera
- Family: Lycaenidae
- Genus: Lachnocnema
- Species: L. jolyana

Binomial name
- Lachnocnema jolyana Libert, 1996

Species of butterfly

Lachnocnema jolyana is a butterfly in the family Lycaenidae. It is found in Cameroon and the Republic of the Congo.
