= Lagenaria guineensis =

Scientific classification
- Kingdom: Plantae
- Clade: Tracheophytes
- Clade: Angiosperms
- Clade: Eudicots
- Clade: Rosids
- Order: Cucurbitales
- Family: Cucurbitaceae
- Genus: Lagenaria
- Species: L. guineensis

Binomial name
- Lagenaria guineensis (G.Don) C.Jeffrey (1962)

Synonyms
- Adenopus guineensis (G.Don) Exell; Adenopus longiflorus Benth.; Adenopus pynaertii De Wild.; Bryonia guineensis G.Don

Species of flowering plant in the family Apiaceae

Lagenaria guineensis is a species of flowering plant. It is a climbing vine that is found in tropical West Africa and the Congo Basin. It forms oblong, green fruits with whitish spots across the surface. The fruits are similar to those of other members of the Lagenaria genus.
