= Lagenaria breviflora =

Scientific classification
- Kingdom: Plantae
- Clade: Tracheophytes
- Clade: Angiosperms
- Clade: Eudicots
- Clade: Rosids
- Order: Cucurbitales
- Family: Cucurbitaceae
- Genus: Lagenaria
- Species: L. breviflora

Binomial name
- Lagenaria breviflora (Benth.) Roberty

Synonyms
- Adenopus breviflorus Benth.; Adenopus ledermannii Harms; Adenopus multiflorus Cogn.; Adenopus noctiflorus Gilg; Lagenaria angolensis Naudin; Luffa angolensis (Naudin) A.Chev.

Species of flowering plant in the family Apiaceae

Lagenaria breviflora is a species of flowering plant. It is a climbing vine that is found across Central Africa, East Africa, and West Africa.

== Description ==
It has large, 7 to 20 cm ovate-triangular leaves with hairy undersides and partly-dense hairs on the leaf petioles. It grows vine branches up to 6 meters long. It forms ~9x7 cm oblong, green fruits with whitish spots across the surface. The fruits are similar to those of other members of the Lagenaria genus.
