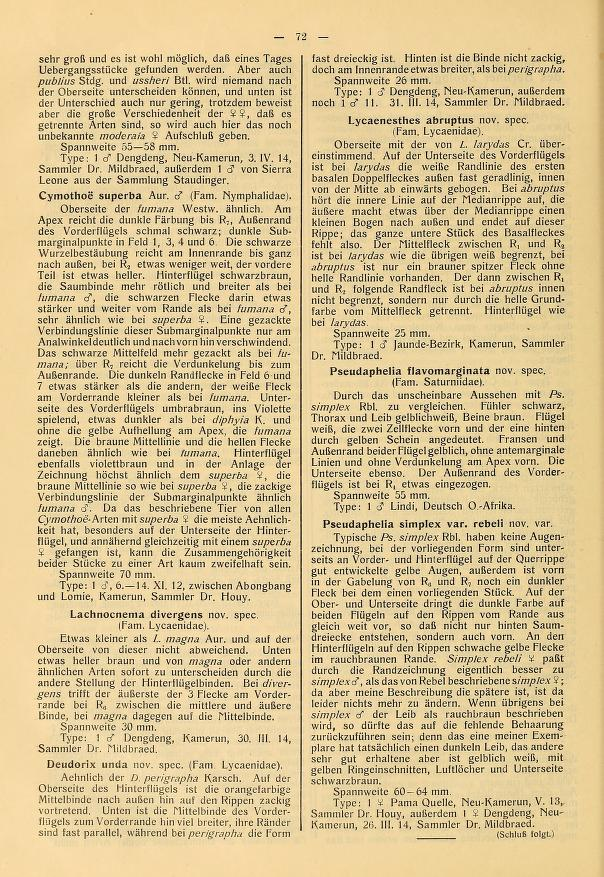
- Original description by Gaede in 1915

Scientific classification
- Kingdom: Animalia
- Phylum: Arthropoda
- Class: Insecta
- Order: Lepidoptera
- Family: Lycaenidae
- Genus: Lachnocnema
- Species: L. divergens

Binomial name
- Lachnocnema divergens Gaede, 1915

= Lachnocnema divergens =

Divergent woolly legs

Species of butterfly

Lachnocnema divergens, the divergent woolly legs, is a butterfly in the family Lycaenidae. It is found in south-eastern Nigeria, Cameroon, Gabon, the Republic of the Congo, the Central African Republic, the Democratic Republic of the Congo, southern Sudan, Uganda, Rwanda, Burundi, Ethiopia, western Kenya and north-western Tanzania. Its habitat consists of forests.
