= Lachnocnema durbani =

D'Urban's woolly legs
- in Seitz g

Scientific classification
- Kingdom: Animalia
- Phylum: Arthropoda
- Clade: Pancrustacea
- Class: Insecta
- Order: Lepidoptera
- Family: Lycaenidae
- Genus: Lachnocnema
- Species: L. durbani

Binomial name
- Lachnocnema durbani Trimen, 1887

Synonyms
- Lachnocnema d'urbani

Species of butterfly

Lachnocnema durbani, the D'Urban's woolly legs, is a butterfly of the family Lycaenidae. It is found from Cape Point and KwaZulu-Natal to Mozambique to Kenya, Malawi, Tanzania, and Uganda. The habitat consists of grassy areas in savanna.

The wingspan is 24.5–28 mm (0.96–1.10 in) for males and 24.5–30 mm (0.96–1.18 in) for females. Adults are on wing year-round in warmer areas with peaks in spring and late summer.

The larvae prey on Coccidae and Membracidae species.
