= Lachnocnema jacksoni =

Scientific classification
- Kingdom: Animalia
- Phylum: Arthropoda
- Class: Insecta
- Order: Lepidoptera
- Family: Lycaenidae
- Genus: Lachnocnema
- Species: L. jacksoni

Binomial name
- Lachnocnema jacksoni Stempffer, 1967

Species of butterfly

Lachnocnema jacksoni is a butterfly in the family Lycaenidae. It is found in Uganda (the western shores of Lake Victoria) and north-western Tanzania. The habitat consists of forests.
