= Lachnocnema disrupta =

Toothed white woolly legs

Scientific classification
- Kingdom: Animalia
- Phylum: Arthropoda
- Class: Insecta
- Order: Lepidoptera
- Family: Lycaenidae
- Genus: Lachnocnema
- Species: L. disrupta

Binomial name
- Lachnocnema disrupta Talbot, 1935

Species of butterfly

Lachnocnema disrupta, the toothed white woolly legs, is a butterfly in the family Lycaenidae. It is found in Ivory Coast, Ghana (the Volta Region), eastern Nigeria, Cameroon, the Democratic Republic of the Congo, Uganda, and Zambia.
