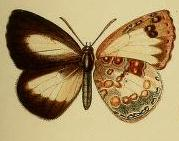

Scientific classification
- Kingdom: Animalia
- Phylum: Arthropoda
- Class: Insecta
- Order: Lepidoptera
- Family: Lycaenidae
- Genus: Lachnocnema
- Species: L. magna

Binomial name
- Lachnocnema magna Aurivillius, 1895

Synonyms
- Lachnocnema busoga Bethune-Baker, 1906; Lachnocnema niveus Druce, 1910

= Lachnocnema magna =

Large woolly legs

Species of butterfly

Lachnocnema magna, the large woolly legs, is a butterfly in the family Lycaenidae. It is found in eastern Nigeria, Cameroon, the Republic of the Congo, the Democratic Republic of the Congo, and Uganda.
