= Lachnocnema brunea =

Scientific classification
- Kingdom: Animalia
- Phylum: Arthropoda
- Class: Insecta
- Order: Lepidoptera
- Family: Lycaenidae
- Genus: Lachnocnema
- Species: L. brunea

Binomial name
- Lachnocnema brunea Libert, 1996

Species of butterfly

Lachnocnema brunea is a butterfly in the family Lycaenidae. It is found in Cameroon, the Democratic Republic of the Congo, Uganda, north-western Tanzania, and western Kenya.
