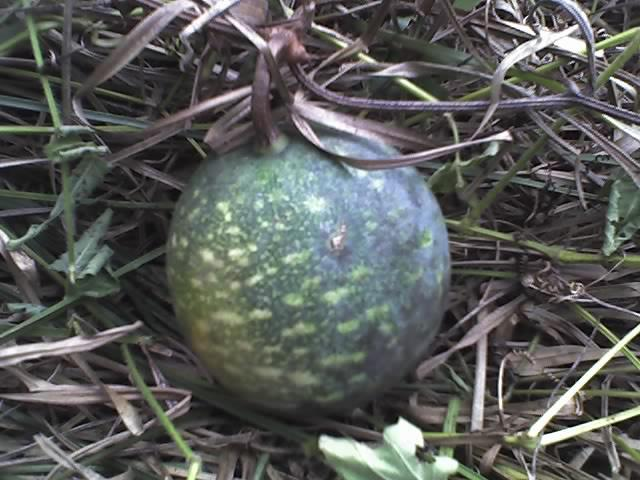
- Fruit of Lagenaria sphaerica

Scientific classification
- Kingdom: Plantae
- Clade: Tracheophytes
- Clade: Angiosperms
- Clade: Eudicots
- Clade: Rosids
- Order: Cucurbitales
- Family: Cucurbitaceae
- Genus: Lagenaria
- Species: L. sphaerica

Binomial name
- Lagenaria sphaerica (Sond.) Naudin

Synonyms
- Adenopus abyssinicus Hook.f.; Adenopus reticulatus Gilg; Lagenaria mascarena Naudin; Lagenaria sphaerocarpa Arn.; Luffa sphaerica Sond.; Sphaerosicyos meyeri Hook.f.; Sphaerosicyos sphaericus (Sond.) Cogn.

= Lagenaria sphaerica =

Wild melon

Species of African gourd

Lagenaria sphaerica is a herbaceous climber in the family Cucurbitaceae. It is commonly known as the wild melon.

These plants are found in low-lying areas from the Eastern Cape of South Africa to East Africa. The may grow along river floodplains or up into the canopy of riparian forests. They may also be found in coastal dune vegetation.

These plants produce large white flowers which attract many insects. The melon gourd is green and flecked with white.

In Tanzania, only the male flowers produce nectar, which is fed on by the Eastern Olive Sunbird, but the actual pollinators are carpenter bees in the genus Xylocopa; female individuals mimic the males but are nectarless.

Where the plant is native, the leaves and immature fruit are used as vegetables; the mature fruit is both unpalatable and poisonous. Various parts of the plant, including the roots, are used medicinally. Apart from consumption, the fruit are also used a soap substitute, for rodenticide and insecticide, and by children as balls. The vine is also used as an ornamental plant.

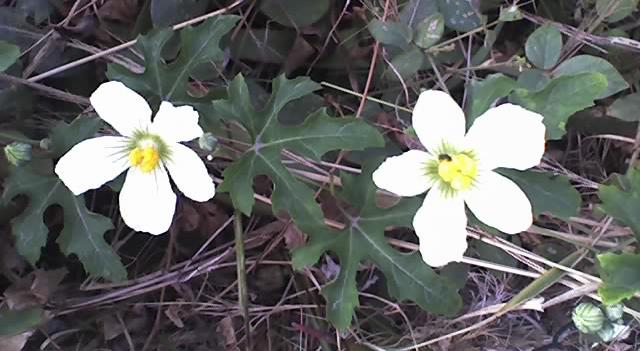
Flowers

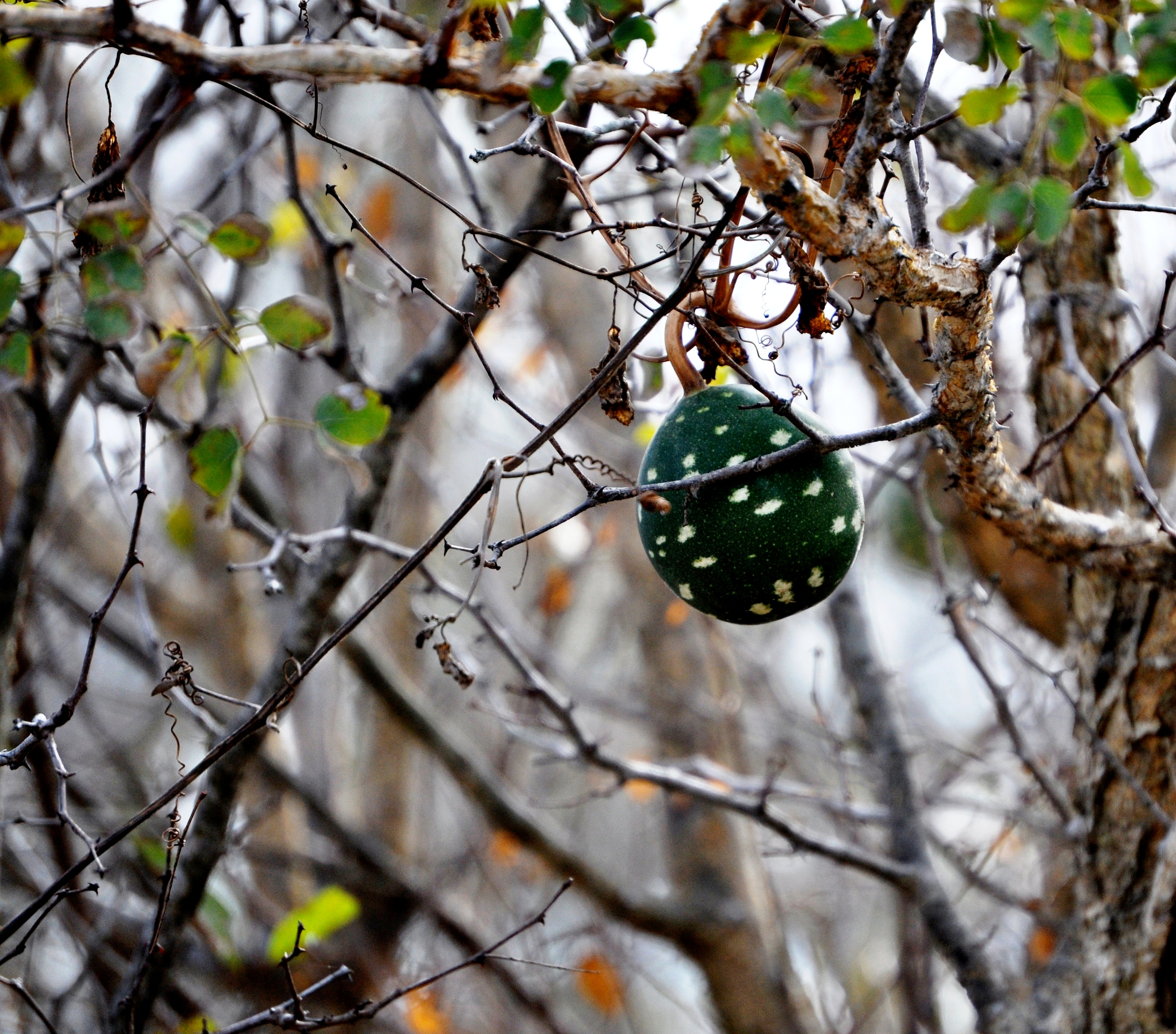
Climbing in Acacia sp.
