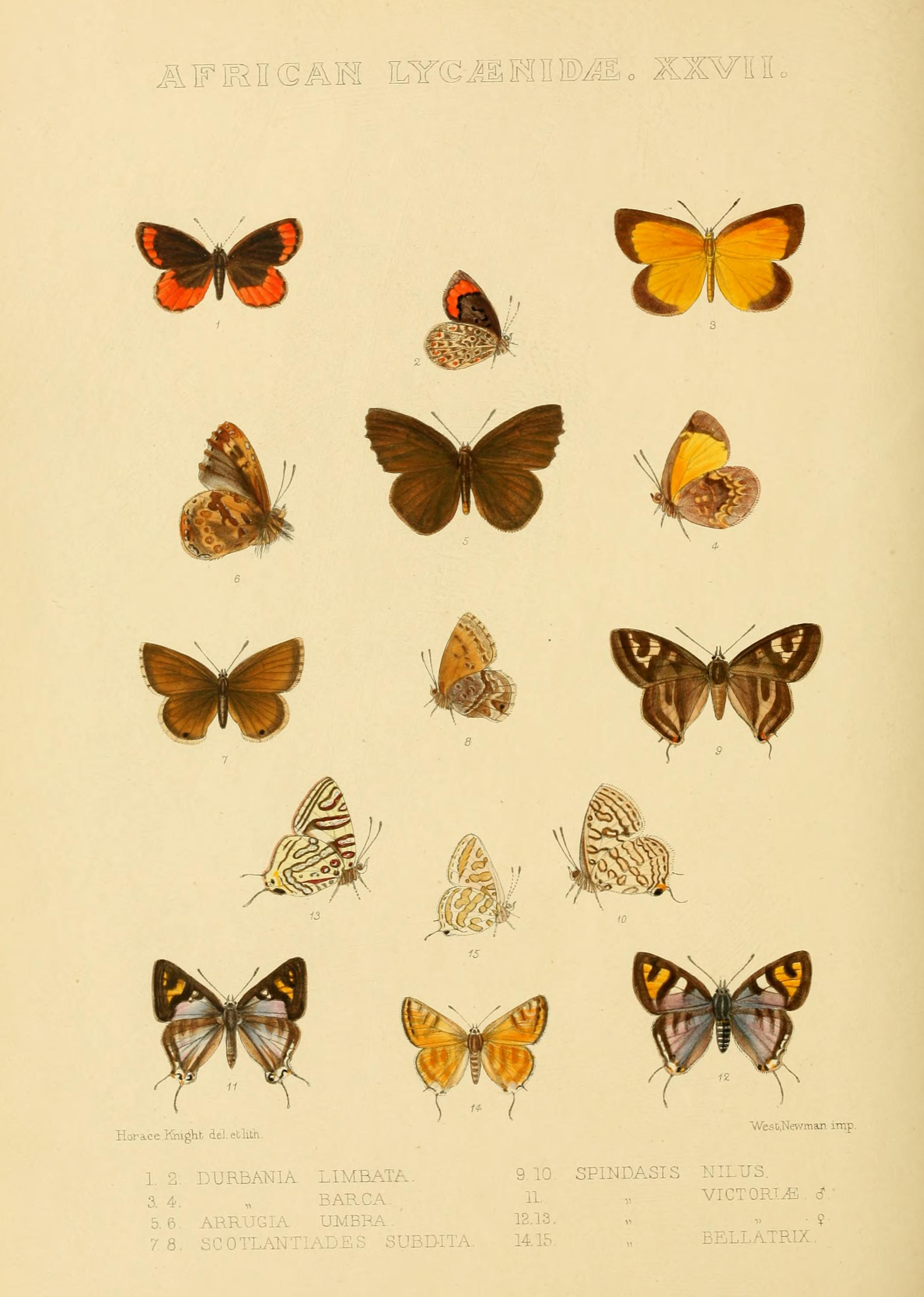
- Figures 5 and 6

Scientific classification
- Kingdom: Animalia
- Phylum: Arthropoda
- Class: Insecta
- Order: Lepidoptera
- Family: Lycaenidae
- Genus: Lachnocnema
- Species: L. reutlingeri

Binomial name
- Lachnocnema reutlingeri Holland, 1892

Synonyms
- Arrugia umbra Grose-Smith, 1901; Lachnocnema makakensis Birket-Smith, 1960; Lachnocnema camerunica d'Abrera, 1980

= Lachnocnema reutlingeri =

Reutlinger's large woolly legs

Species of butterfly

Lachnocnema reutlingeri, the Reutlinger's large woolly legs, is a butterfly belonging to the Lycaenidae family. It is found in Ghana, Nigeria, Cameroon, Equatorial Guinea, Gabon, the Republic of the Congo, the Democratic Republic of the Congo, Sudan, and Uganda.

== Subspecies ==
- Lachnocnema reutlingeri reutlingeri (Ghana, Nigeria, Cameroon, Equatorial Guinea, Gabon, Congo, western Democratic Republic of the Congo)
- Lachnocnema reutlingeri perspicua Libert, 1996 (northern and eastern Democratic Republic of the Congo, southern Sudan, Uganda)
