= Christoph Friedrich Otto =

German gardener and botanist

Christoph Friedrich Otto (4 December 1783 – 7 December 1856) was a German gardener and botanist.

He was born in Schneeberg, Saxony. From 1805 to 1843 he was inspector of the Botanical Garden in Berlin. Together with Albert Gottfried Dietrich (1795–1856), he edited the Allgemeinen Gartenzeitung from 1833 until his death in 1856 in Berlin.

The genus of plants Ottoa H.B.K. is named after him. As a taxonomist, he was the binomial authority/co-authority of many species, including numerous plants within the family Cactaceae.

== Published works ==
- Abbildung der fremden in Deutschland ausdauernden Holzarten, 1819–1830 (with Friedrich Guimpel and Friedrich Gottlob Hayne).
- Abbildungen auserlesener Gewächse des königlichen botanischen Gartens, 1820–1828 (with Heinrich Friedrich Link) - Illustrations of plants from the royal botanical gardens.
- Abbildungen neuer und seltener Gewächse …, 1828–1831 (with Heinrich Friedrich Link) - Illustrations of new and rare plants.
- Abbildung und Beschreibung blühender Cacteen, 1838–1850 (with Ludwig Karl Georg Pfeiffer) - Illustrations and descriptions of blooming cacti.
- "Icones plantarum rariorum horti Regii Botanici Berolinensis" - (Illustrations of rare plants of the royal botanical gardens), 1840–1844 (with Heinrich Friedrich Link and Johann Friedrich Klotzsch).
