= Lachnocnema abyssinica =

Scientific classification
- Kingdom: Animalia
- Phylum: Arthropoda
- Class: Insecta
- Order: Lepidoptera
- Family: Lycaenidae
- Genus: Lachnocnema
- Species: L. abyssinica

Binomial name
- Lachnocnema abyssinica Libert, 1996

Species of butterfly

Lachnocnema abyssinica is a butterfly in the family Lycaenidae. It is found in Ethiopia, Eritrea, Sudan, Uganda and possibly Chad.
