= Lippia salicifolia =

Conservation status
- Vulnerable (IUCN 2.3)

Scientific classification
- Kingdom: Plantae
- Clade: Tracheophytes
- Clade: Angiosperms
- Clade: Eudicots
- Clade: Asterids
- Order: Lamiales
- Family: Verbenaceae
- Genus: Lippia
- Species: L. salicifolia

Binomial name
- Lippia salicifolia Andersson

Species of flowering plant

Lippia salicifolia is a species of flowering plant in the verbena family, Verbenaceae, that is endemic to the island of Floreana in the Galápagos Islands of Ecuador. It is threatened by habitat loss.
