= Lagenaria abyssinica =

Scientific classification
- Kingdom: Plantae
- Clade: Embryophytes
- Clade: Tracheophytes
- Clade: Angiosperms
- Clade: Eudicots
- Clade: Rosids
- Order: Cucurbitales
- Family: Cucurbitaceae
- Genus: Lagenaria
- Species: L. abyssinica

Binomial name
- Lagenaria abyssinica (Hook.f.) C.Jeffrey

Synonyms
- Adenopus abyssinicus Hook.f.; Adenopus reticulatus Gilg

Species of flowering plant

Lagenaria abyssinica is a species of cucurbit plant. It is a climbing vine. The stem and branches are covered in hair-like spines. It ranges from Africa to Asia. The fruit is used to make bottles and instruments. It is also grown as an ornamental plant.
