= Friedrich Gottlob Hayne =

German botanist, taxonomist, pharmacist and professor

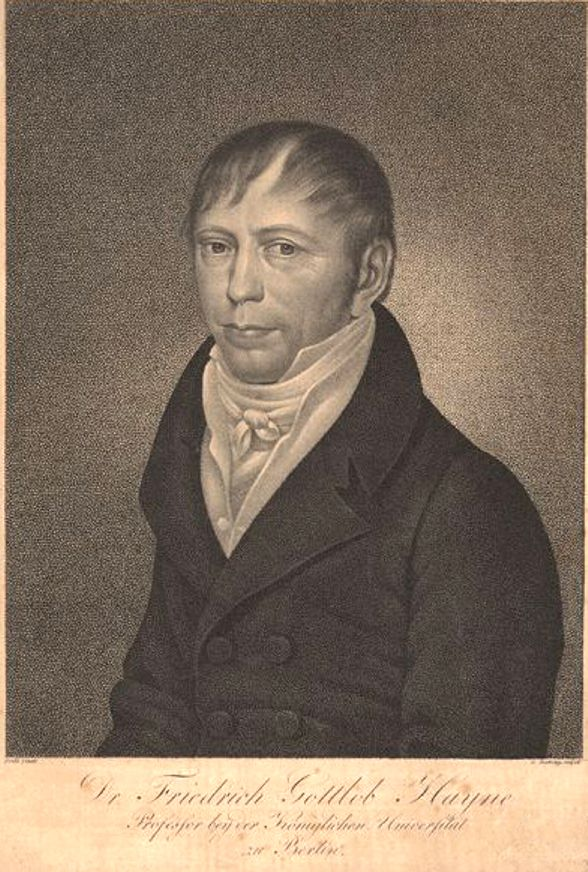
Friedrich Gottlob Hayne

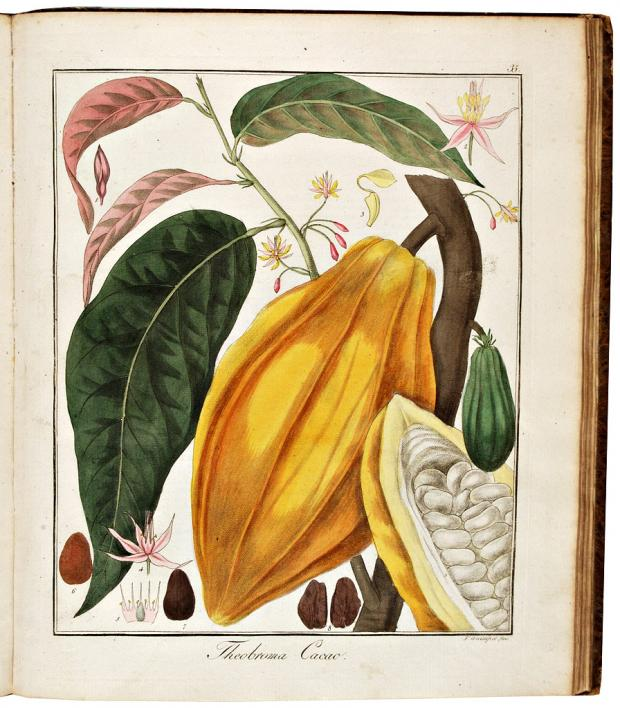
Theobroma cacao Arzneykunde Gewächse

Friedrich Gottlob Hayne (18 March 1763 in Jüterbog – 24 April 1832 in Berlin) was a German botanist, taxonomist, pharmacist and professor.

Hayne showed an early interest in the plant world. From 1778 until 1796 he worked as a pharmacist in Berlin, and was acquainted with the botanist Carl Ludwig Willdenow of about the same age, who at the time was also a pharmacist in Berlin. From 1797 he worked on botanical and technical commissions for the factories department of the Prussian government.

From 1801 to 1808 he worked in Schönebeck on the Elbe, where he was an assistant in the "Royal Prussian Chemical Factory" (later named 'Hermania'), which was founded in 1793 by pharmacist Carl Hermann Samuel and was the first German chemical factory. During his stay in Schönebeck he studied the chemical composition of plants and collected the flora of the region.

After the Treaty of Tilsit in 1807, the Kingdom of Prussia lost about half of its territory, including all territory west of the Elbe. This prompted Hayne to return to Berlin in 1808. From 1811 he taught at the University of Berlin as a lecturer in botany, and in 1814 he was appointed extraordinary professor. After many years of teaching, he was appointed Professor of Pharmaceutical Botany in 1828. In addition to his lecturing duties he led many botanical excursions. He was known for using precise terminology in his plant descriptions.

Stretching over a period of some 30 years, Hayne produced 13 volumes of "Getreue Darstellung und Beschreibung der in der Arzneykunde gebräuchlichen Gewächse" each with 48 copper engravings of pharmaceutically interesting plants, mostly done by Friedrich Guimpel and Peter Haas. Hayne was an honorary member of the Berlin Society of Friends of Natural Science.

== Works ==
- "Termini botanici iconibus illustrati oder botanische Kunstsprache durch Abbildungen erläutert", 2 volumes (1799–1817)
- "Getreue Darstellung und Beschreibung der in der Arzneykunde gebräuchlichen Gewächse" (1805–1837) 13 volumes, 4to (270 x 225mm), with 1 lithographed portrait and 624 handcoloured engraved plates, engraved by Friedrich Guimpel (*1774)
- "Choix de Plantes d'Europe, décrites et dessinées d'après nature" - 5 volumes (1802) Johann Friedrich Peter Dreves & Friedrich Gottlob Hayne
- "Getreue Darstellung und Beschreibung der in der Arzneykunde gebräuchlichen Gewächse wie auch solcher, welche mit ihnen verwechselt werden können". 12 Volumes, 1805–1856 (continued from Johann Friedrich Brandt, Julius Theodor Christian Ratzeburg und Johann Friedrich Klotzsch). Digital Edition by the University and State Library Düsseldorf
- "Abbildung der deutschen Holzarten für Forstmänner und Liebhaber der Botanik" 2 Volumes, 1815-1820 Digital edition by the University and State Library Düsseldorf
