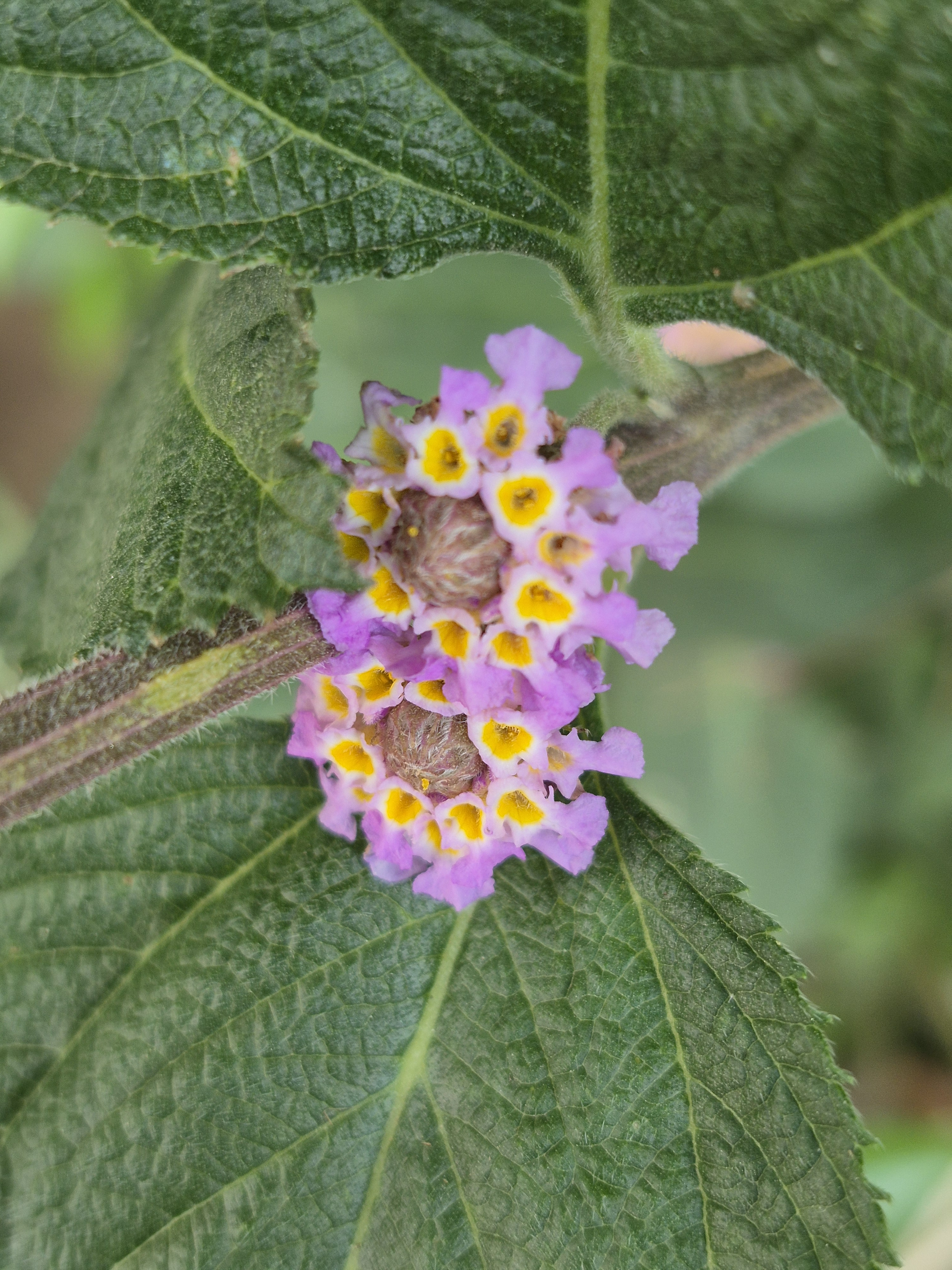
- Flower in Brazil

Scientific classification
- Kingdom: Plantae
- Clade: Tracheophytes
- Clade: Angiosperms
- Clade: Eudicots
- Clade: Asterids
- Order: Lamiales
- Family: Verbenaceae
- Genus: Lippia
- Species: L. alba

Binomial name
- Lippia alba (Mill.) N.E.Br. ex Britton & P.Wilson

Synonyms
- List: Camara alba (Mill.) Kuntze; Lantana alba Mill.; Lantana cuneatifolia Klotzsch ex Walp.; Lantana geminata (Kunth) Spreng.; Lantana lippioides Hook. & Arn. nom. illeg.; Lantana malabarica Hayek; Lantana mollissima Desf.; Lantana odorata (Pers.) Weigelt ex Cham. nom. illeg.; Lippia asperifolia Poepp. ex Cham.; Lippia carterae (Moldenke) G.L.Nesom; Lippia citrata Willd. ex Cham.; Lippia crenata Sessé & Moc.; Lippia geminata Kunth; Lippia globiflora (L'Hér.) Kuntze; Lippia havanensis Turcz.; Lippia lantanifolia F.Muell.; Lippia lantanoides (Lam.) Herter nom. illeg.; Lippia lantanoides J.M.Coult. nom. illeg.; Lippia obovata Sessé & Moc.; Lippia panamensis Turcz.; Lippia unica Ramakr.; Verbena globiflora L'Hér.; Verbena globulifera Spreng.; Verbena lantanoides (Lam.) Willd. ex Spreng.; Zappania geminata (Kunth) Gibert; Zappania globiflora (L'Hér.) Juss.; Zappania globiflora (L'Hér.) Willd.; Zappania lantanoides Lam.; Zappania odorata Pers.

= Lippia alba =

Species of flowering plant

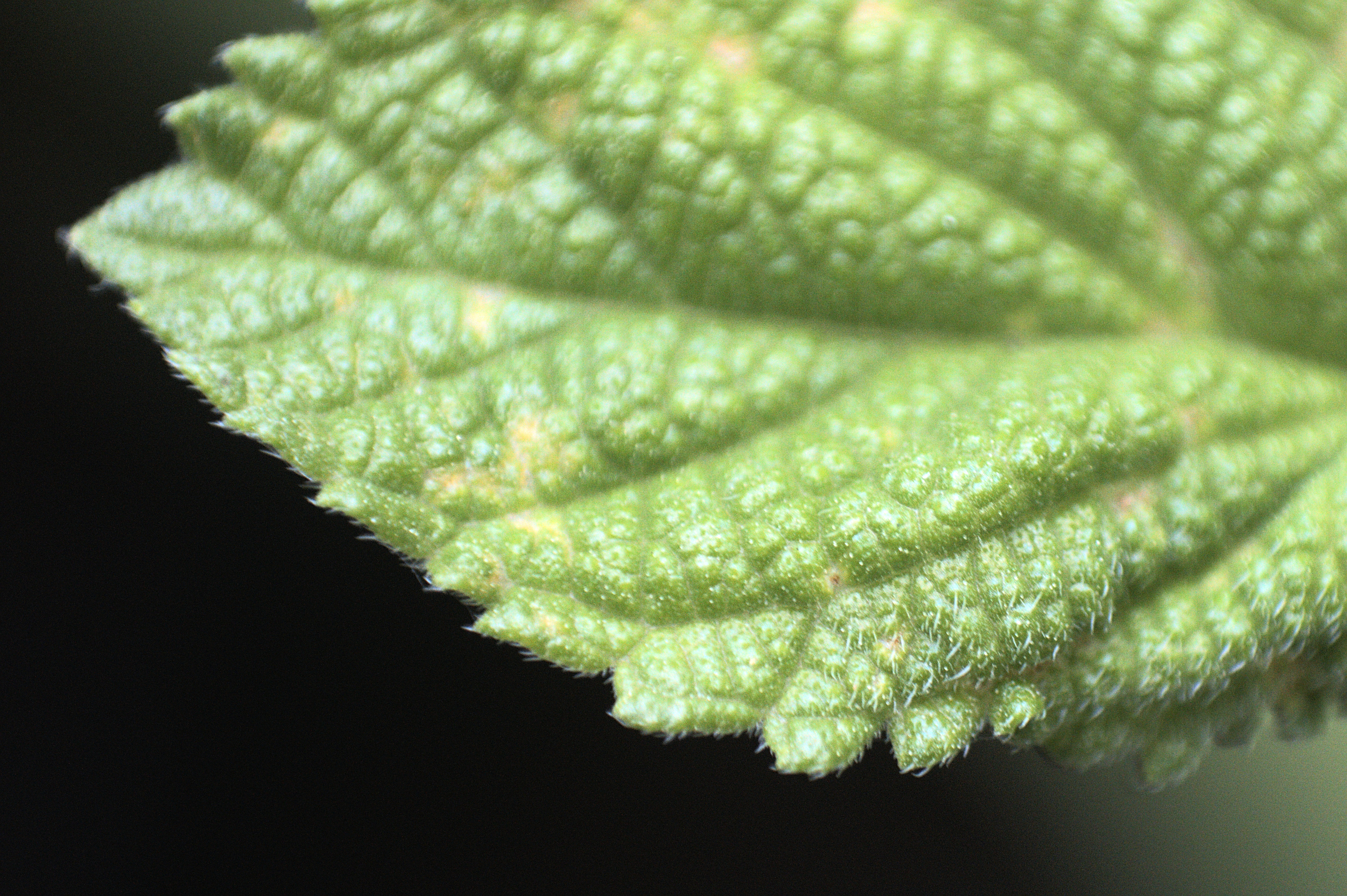
Lippia alba leaf

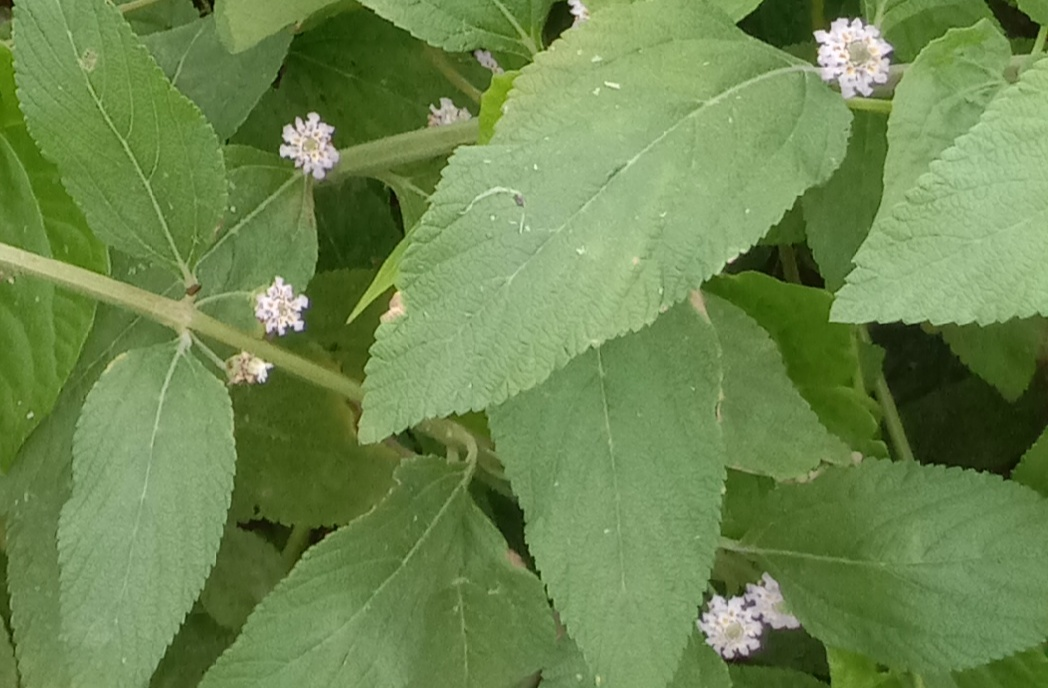
Flowers and leaves

Lippia alba is a species of flowering plant in the verbena family, Verbenaceae, that is native to southern Texas in the United States, Mexico, the Caribbean, Central America, and South America.

The species is also present in Australia and India, where it is probably a human introduction. Common names include bushy matgrass, bushy lippia, hierba negra, juanilama, pamporegano, poleo and pitiona.

== Description ==
It is a multi-branched shrub, reaching a height of 1.5 m (4.9 ft).

Leaves measure 1 to 3 cm (0.39 to 1.18 in) in length and 0.9 to 2 cm (0.35 to 0.79 in) in width and are opposite or in threes.

Flowers with white, pink, or light blue-purple corollas form on spikes 2 cm (0.79 in) long.

== Uses ==
Bushy lippia is widely cultivated as an ornamental for its aromatic foliage and beautiful flowers. The essential oil composition is unique to each plant, but may include piperitone, geranial, neral, caryophyllene, camphor, eucalyptol, limonene, carvone, germacrene, α-guaiene, β-ocimene, linalool, or myrcene. The leaves are used for flavoring foods, such as mole sauces from Oaxaca, Mexico. The plant is used medicinally for its somatic, sedative, antidepressant, and analgesic properties.
