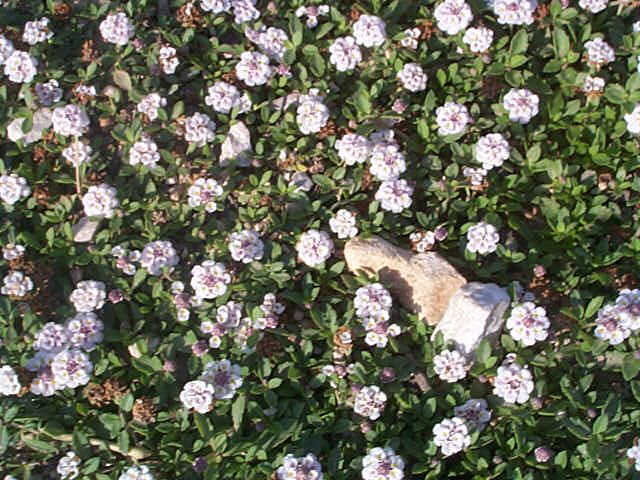

Scientific classification
- Kingdom: Plantae
- Clade: Embryophytes
- Clade: Tracheophytes
- Clade: Spermatophytes
- Clade: Angiosperms
- Clade: Eudicots
- Clade: Asterids
- Order: Lamiales
- Family: Verbenaceae
- Genus: Lippia
- Species: L. dulcis

Binomial name
- Lippia dulcis Trevir.

Synonyms
- Lippia asperifolia Rchb.; Lippia dulcis var. mexicana Wehmer; Phyla dulcis (Trevir.) Moldenke; Phyla scaberrima (Juss. ex Pers.) Moldenke; Zappania scaberrima Juss. ex Pers.

= Lippia dulcis =

Species of flowering plant

Lippia dulcis (syn. Phyla dulcis) is a species of perennial herbaceous plant that is native to southern Mexico, the Caribbean (Cuba, Hispaniola, and Puerto Rico), Central America, Colombia, and Venezuela. It is known by several common names, including Aztec sweet herb, bushy lippia, honeyherb, hierba dulce, and tzopelic-xihuitl (Nahuatl). Its buds are also sold as dushi or dulce (sweet in Papiamento and Spanish respectively) buttons.

== Uses ==
This plant has historically been used as a natural sweetener and medicinal herb in its native Mexico and parts of Central America. It was used by the Aztecs and introduced to the Spanish when they arrived.

The sweet taste is caused by a sesquiterpene compound called hernandulcin, which was discovered in 1985 and named for Francisco Hernández, the Spanish physician who first described the plant in the sixteenth century. Use of Lippia dulcis has not become widespread because it also contains high levels of bitter compounds, especially camphor.
