= Albert Gottfried Dietrich =

German botanist (1795-1856)

Albert Gottfried Dietrich (8 November 1795 – 22 May 1856) was a German botanist born in Danzig.

Dietrich was curator at the Botanical Garden in Berlin and was an instructor at the institute of horticulture at Berlin-Schöneberg. From 1833 to 1856, with Christoph Friedrich Otto (1783–1856), he was publisher of Allgemeine Gartenzeitung, a newspaper devoted to gardening.

== Publications ==
- Terminologie der phanerogamischen Pflanzen…, 1829 - Terminology of phanerogamic plants.
- Flora regni borussici : flora des Königreichs Preussen oder Abbildung und Beschreibung der in Preussen wildwachsenden Pflanzen; published 1833 by Verlag von Ludwig Ochmigke in Berlin, the fungi section (hefts and plates 373–396) are by Johann Friedrich Klotzsch.
- Allgemeine Naturgeschichte und specielle Zoologie für Pharmaceuten und Mediciner, 1842 Digital edition by the University and State Library Düsseldorf
