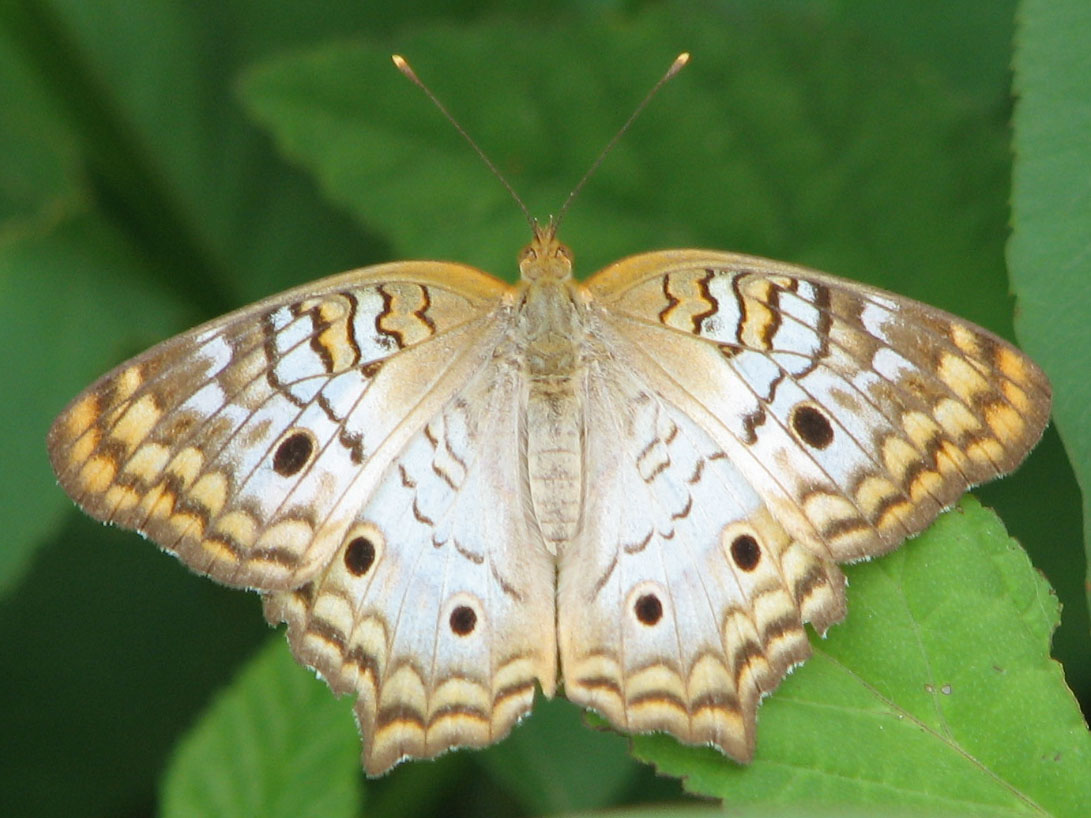
- White peacock (Anartia jatrophae)

Scientific classification
- Domain: Eukaryota
- Kingdom: Animalia
- Phylum: Arthropoda
- Class: Insecta
- Order: Lepidoptera
- Family: Nymphalidae
- Subfamily: Nymphalinae
- Tribe: Victorinini; Scudder, 1893

Genera
- See text

= Victorinini =

Tribe of butterflies

Victorinini is a tribe of brush-footed butterflies. The four butterfly genera contained in this tribe are Anartia, Metamorpha, Napeocles, and Siproeta.

Those genera were previously included in the Kallimini tribe. In the early 2000s, molecular phylogenetics determined that Kallimini encountered a paraphyly with regard to the Melitaeini. There is also some indication that the genus Siproeta could be paraphyletic with regard to Napeocles.

== List of genera ==
Image	Genus	Species
	Anartia (Hübner, 1819) – peacocks	A. amathea (Linnaeus, 1758) – brown (or scarlet) peacock; A. chrysopelea (Hübner, 1831) – Cuban peacock; A. fatima (Fabricius, 1793) – banded peacock or Fatima; A. jatrophae (Linnaeus, 1763) – white peacock; A. lytrea (Godart, 1819) – Godart's peacock
	Metamorpha (Hübner, 1819)	M. elissa (Hübner, 1819)
	Napeocles (Bates, 1864)	N. jucunda (Hübner, 1808)
	Siproeta (Hübner, 1823)	S. epaphus (Latreille, 1813); S. superba (Bates, 1864); S. stelenes (Linnaeus, 1758) – malachite

== Gallery ==
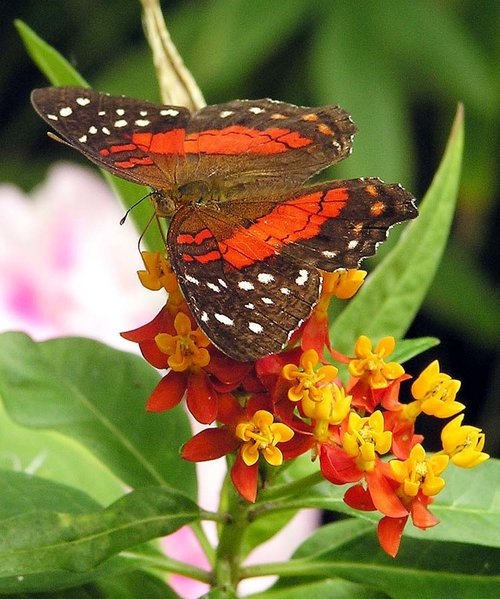
Anartia amathea

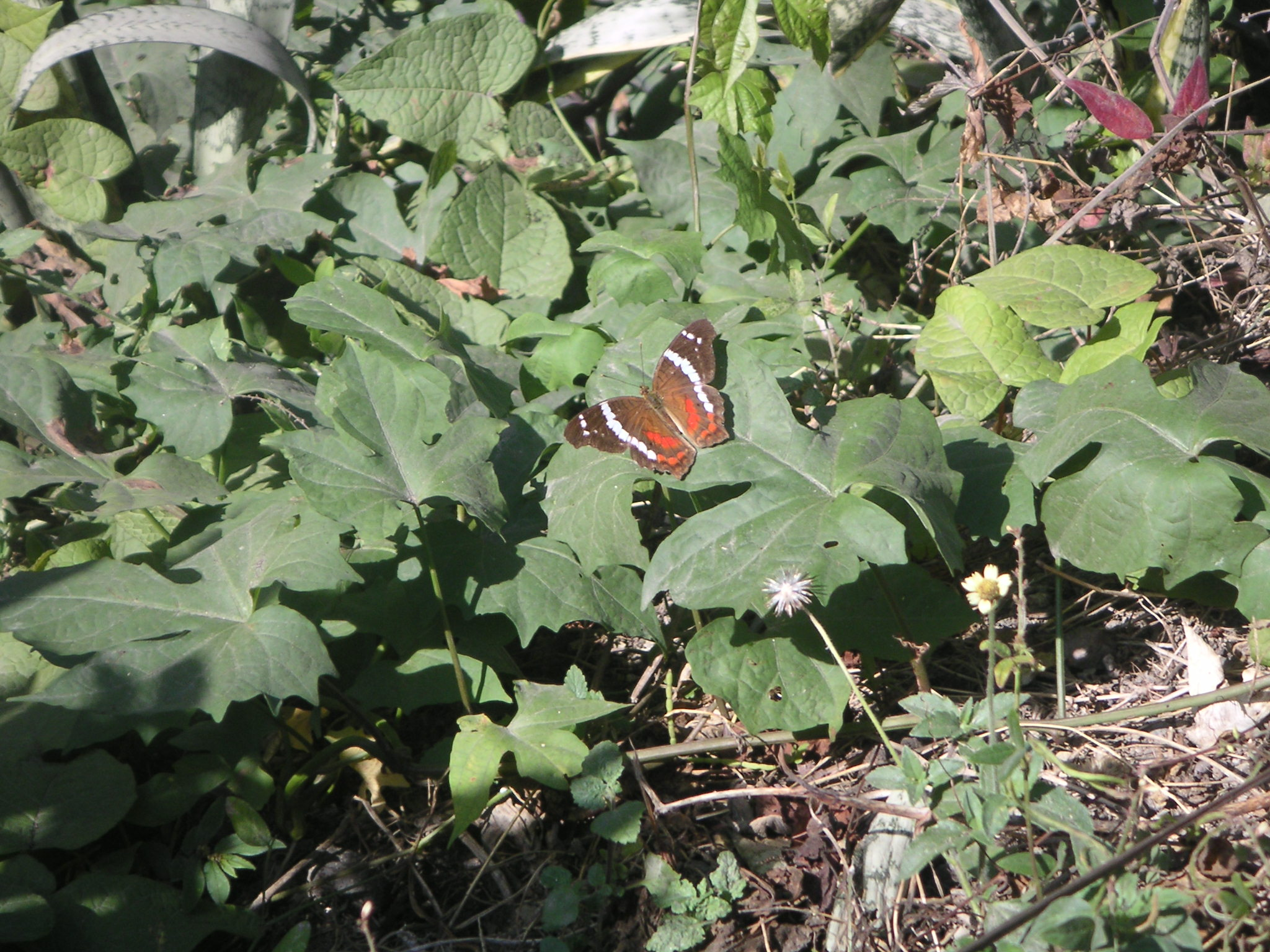
Anartia fatima

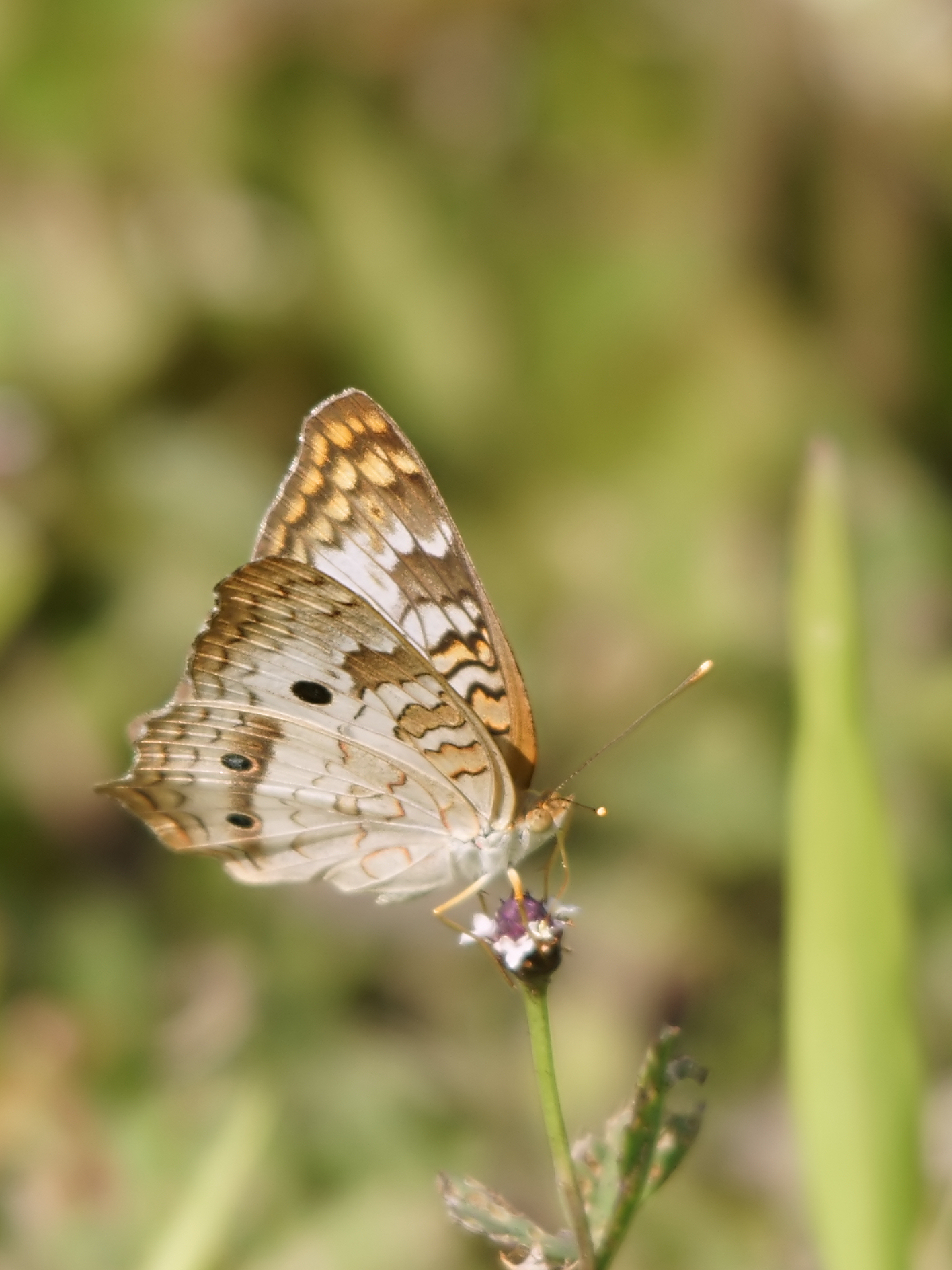
Anartia jatrophae

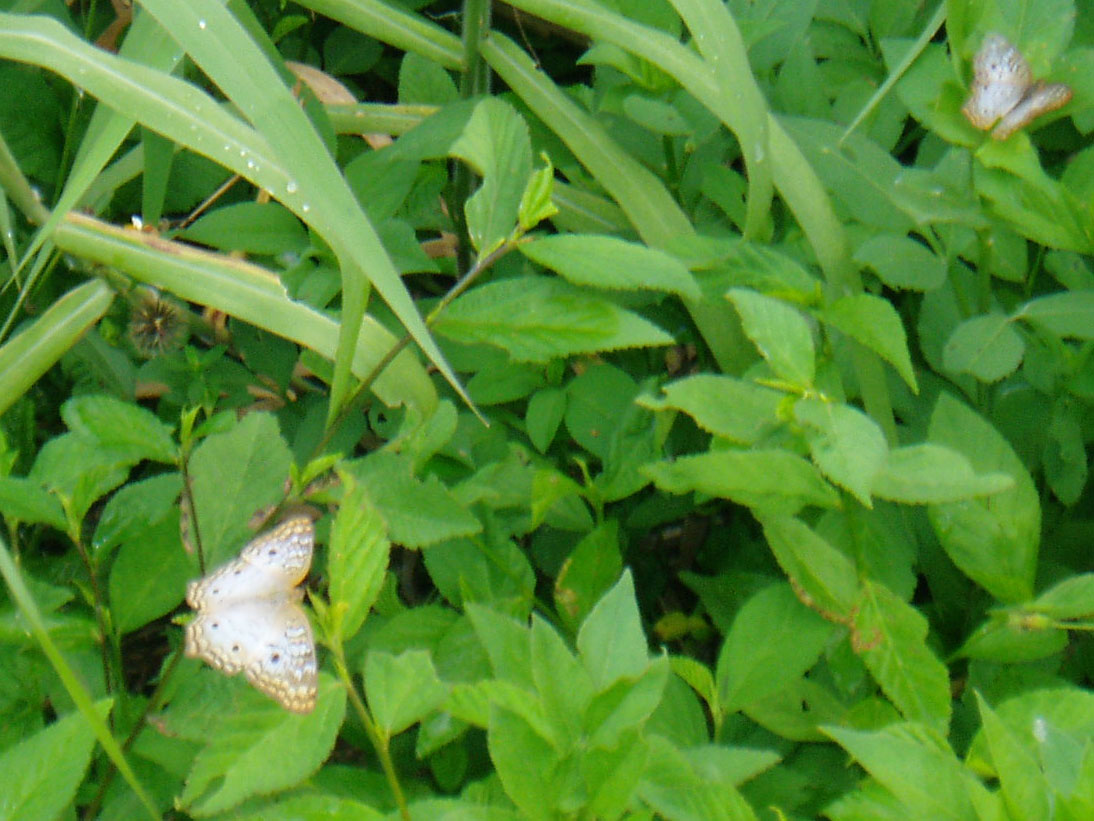
Pair of A. jatrophae

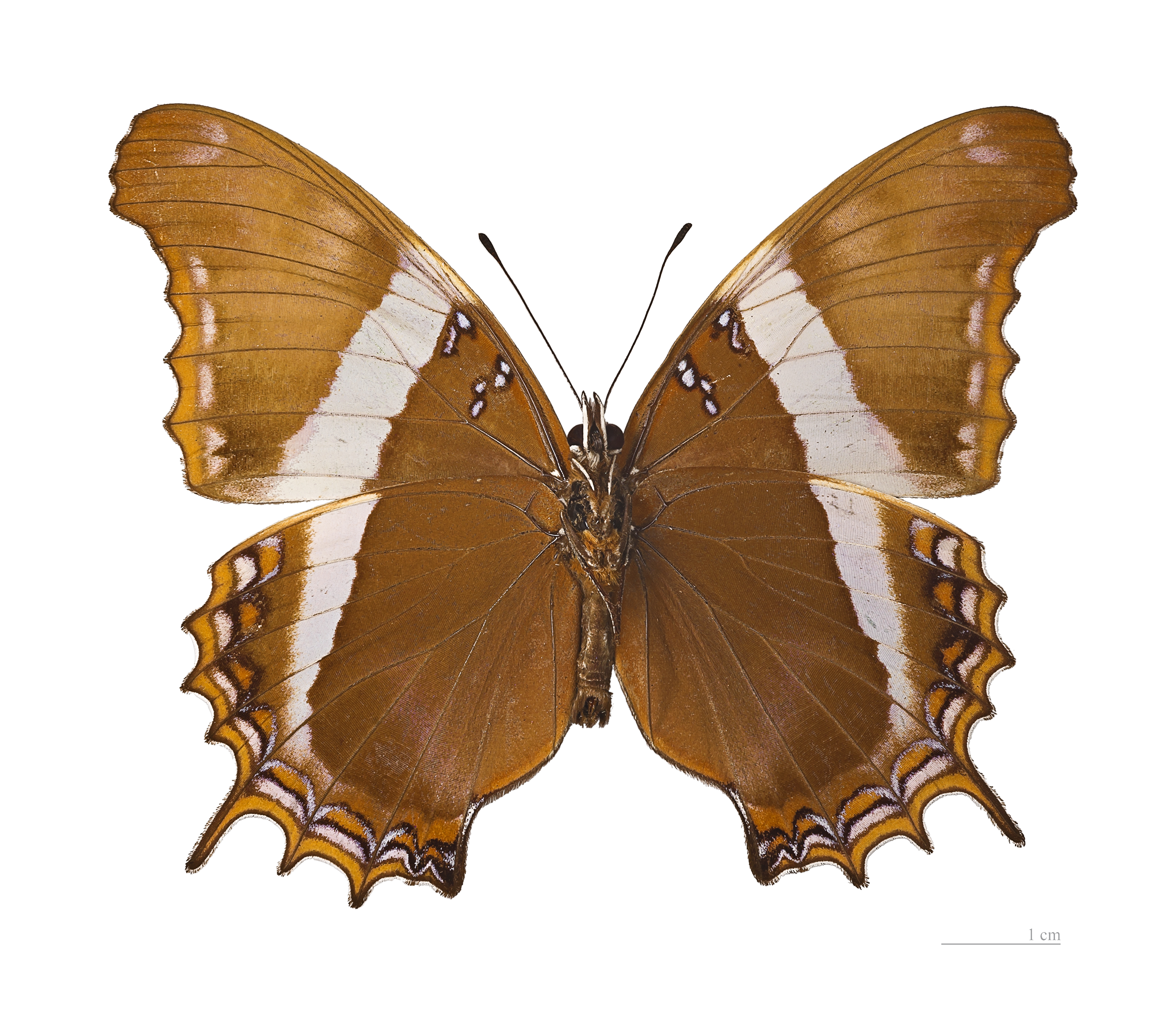
Siproeta superba - MHNT

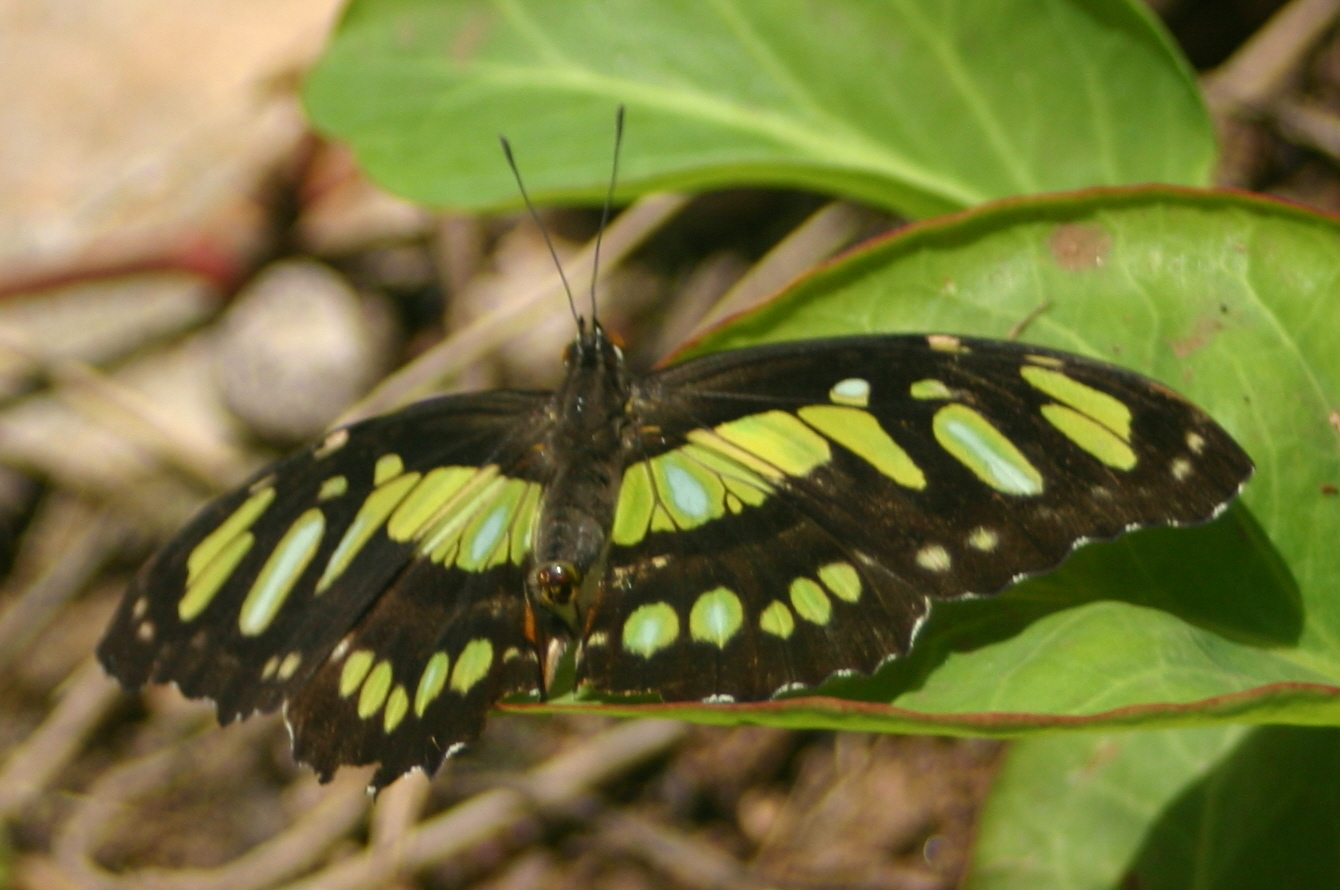
Siproeta stelenes

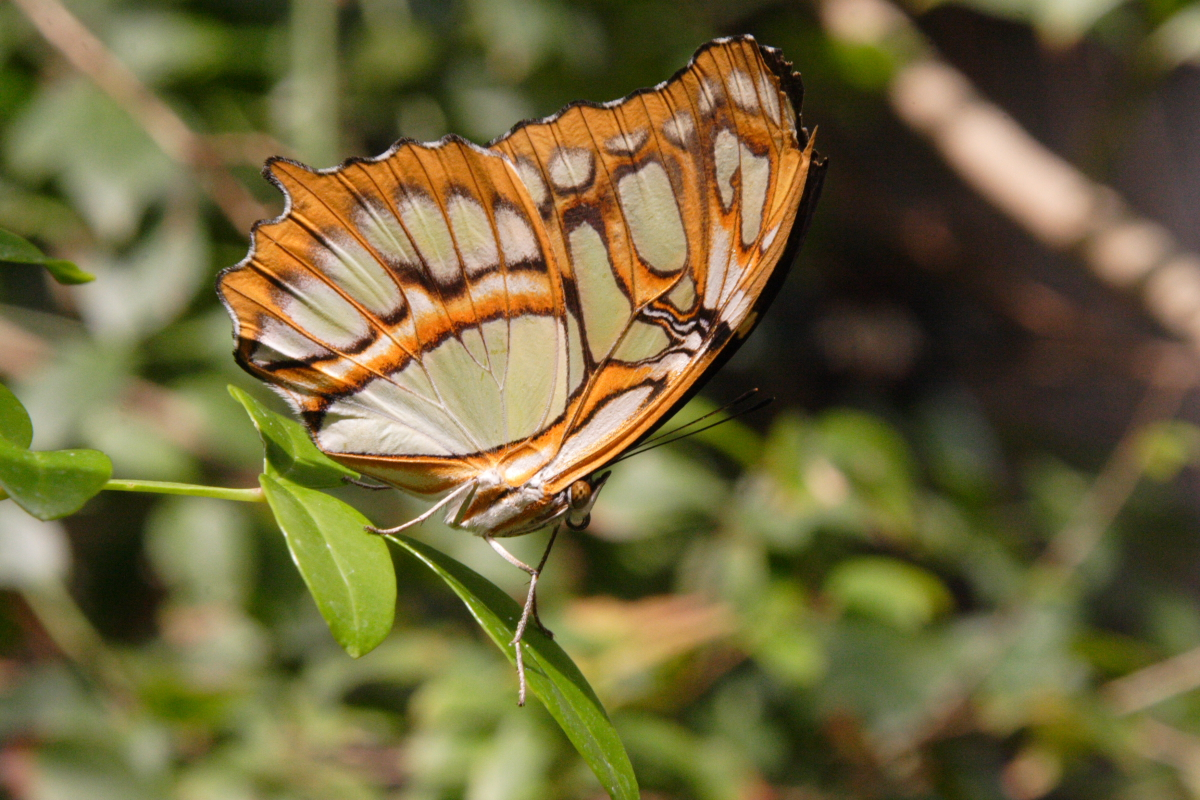
S. stelenes

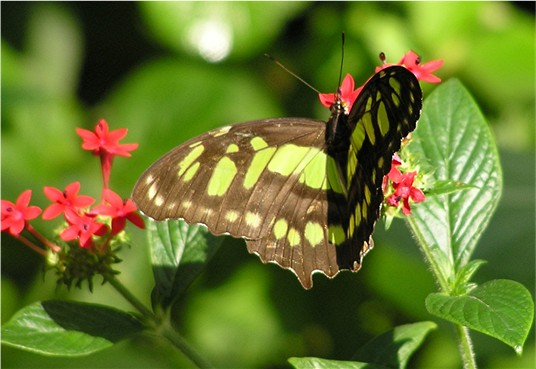
S. stelenes

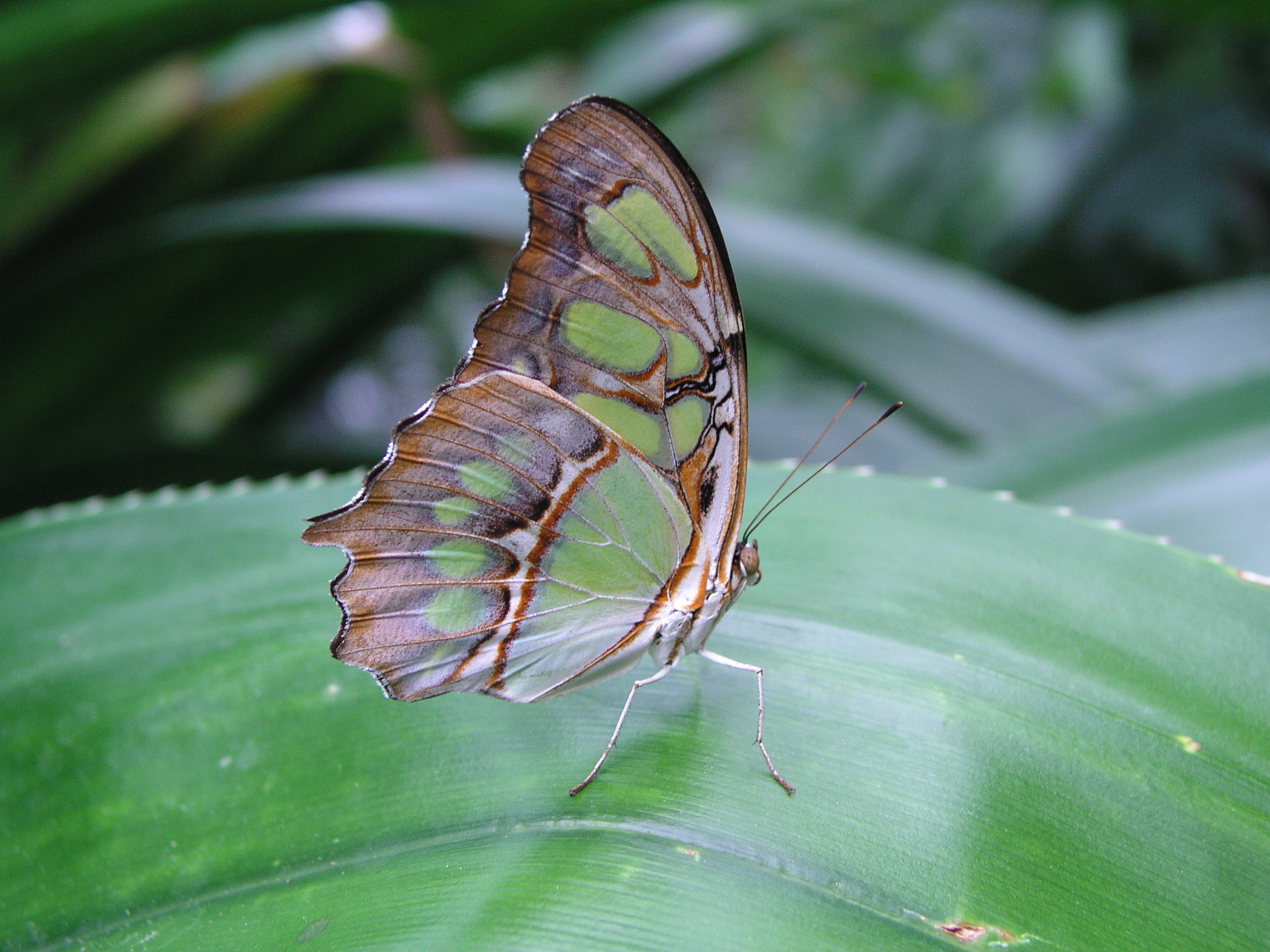
S. stelenes
