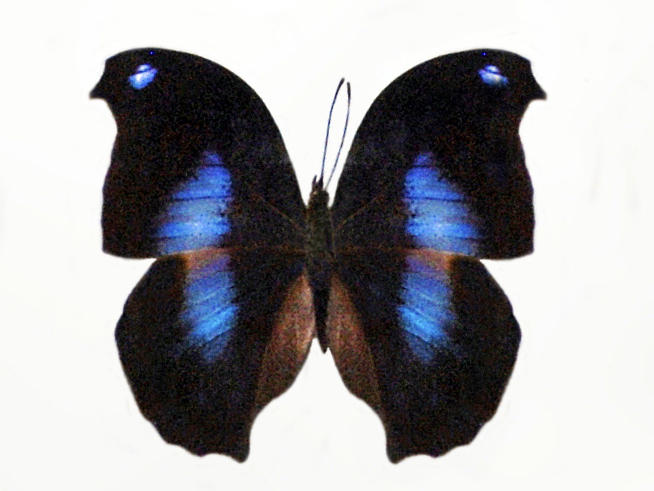
- Mounted specimen

Scientific classification
- Kingdom: Animalia
- Phylum: Arthropoda
- Class: Insecta
- Order: Lepidoptera
- Family: Nymphalidae
- Tribe: Victorinini
- Genus: Napeocles; Bates, 1864
- Species: N. jucunda

Binomial name
- Napeocles jucunda (Hübner, 1808)

Synonyms
- Hamadryas jucunda Hübner, 1808

= Napeocles =

Genus of butterflies

Napeocles jucunda, the great blue hookwing, is a South American butterfly of the family Nymphalidae. The species was first described by Jacob Hübner in 1808.

== Taxonomy ==
It is the only representative of the monotypic Neotropical lowland genus Napeocles, erected by Henry Walter Bates in 1864. It has been assigned to the recently resurrected tribe Victorinini. The species is very similar to some species in tribe Kallimini.

== Subspecies ==
Subspecies include:

- Napeocles jucunda jucunda Hübner, 1808
- Napeocles jucunda caesari Neild, 2008 (Venezuela)
- Napeocles jucunda dumnorix Fruhstorfer, 1912

== Distribution ==
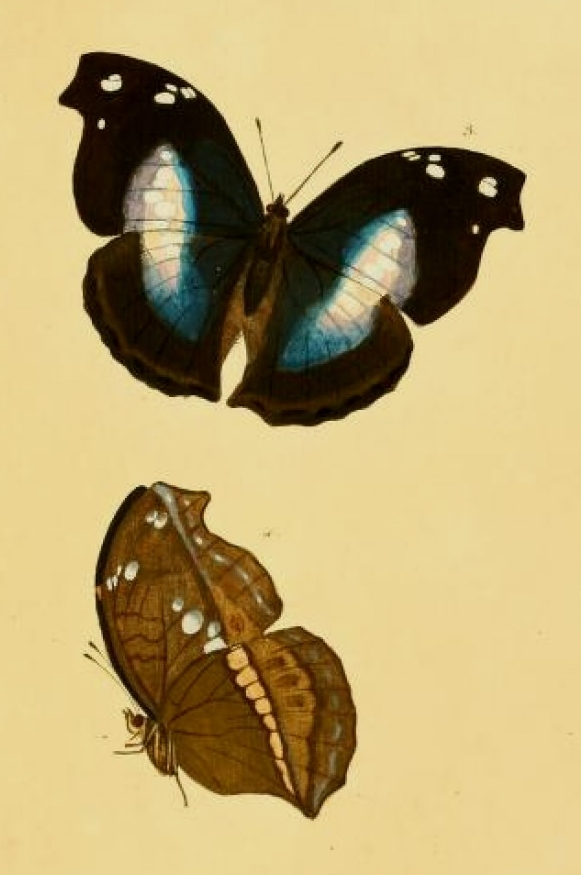
Illustration of Napeocles jucunda from Sammlung exotischer Schmetterlinge (1806)

This species has been recorded in Peru, Bolivia, Venezuela, Brazil, and French Guiana.

== Habitat ==
These butterflies occur in tropical rainforest across the Amazon basin and from the eastern slopes of the Andes. They can usually be found high in the canopy, but sometimes they are also present on the lower foliage of trees and on humid cacao-groves on fallen fruits. The eggs and pupae are very similar to that of Siproeta stelenes, but the final instar larvae is characterized by a dark maroon basal color, with the thorax and abdomen flecked by numerous yellow specks. The immature stages feed on plants in the genus Ruellia.

== Description ==
Napeocles jucunda can reach a wingspan of about 10 cm (3.9 in). These fairly large, wide-winged fine butterflies show a very hard projection on the hindmargins of the forewings, just below the tip, with a deep concavity below. The hindwings are round. The basic color is black or dark brown, with a broad blue to intense white band crossing the middle of the forewings and hindwings. The tip of the forewings shows also a small blue spot. The underside of the wings is colored like a wilted leaf, complete with "middle nerve".

== Bibliography ==
- Lamas, G. ed. (2004). Atlas of Neotropical Lepidoptera. Checklist: Part 4A Hesperioidea - Papiionoidea. Gainesville: Scientific Publishers/Association of Tropical Lepidoptera.
- Palo Jr., Haroldo (2017). Borboletas do Brasil [Butterflies of Brazil]. volume 2. Nymphalidae 1st ed. São Carlos, Brazil: Vento Verde. p. 1254. ISBN 978-85-64060-10-4
- D'Abrera, Bernard (1984). Butterflies of South America. Hill House ISBN 0-9593639-2-0
