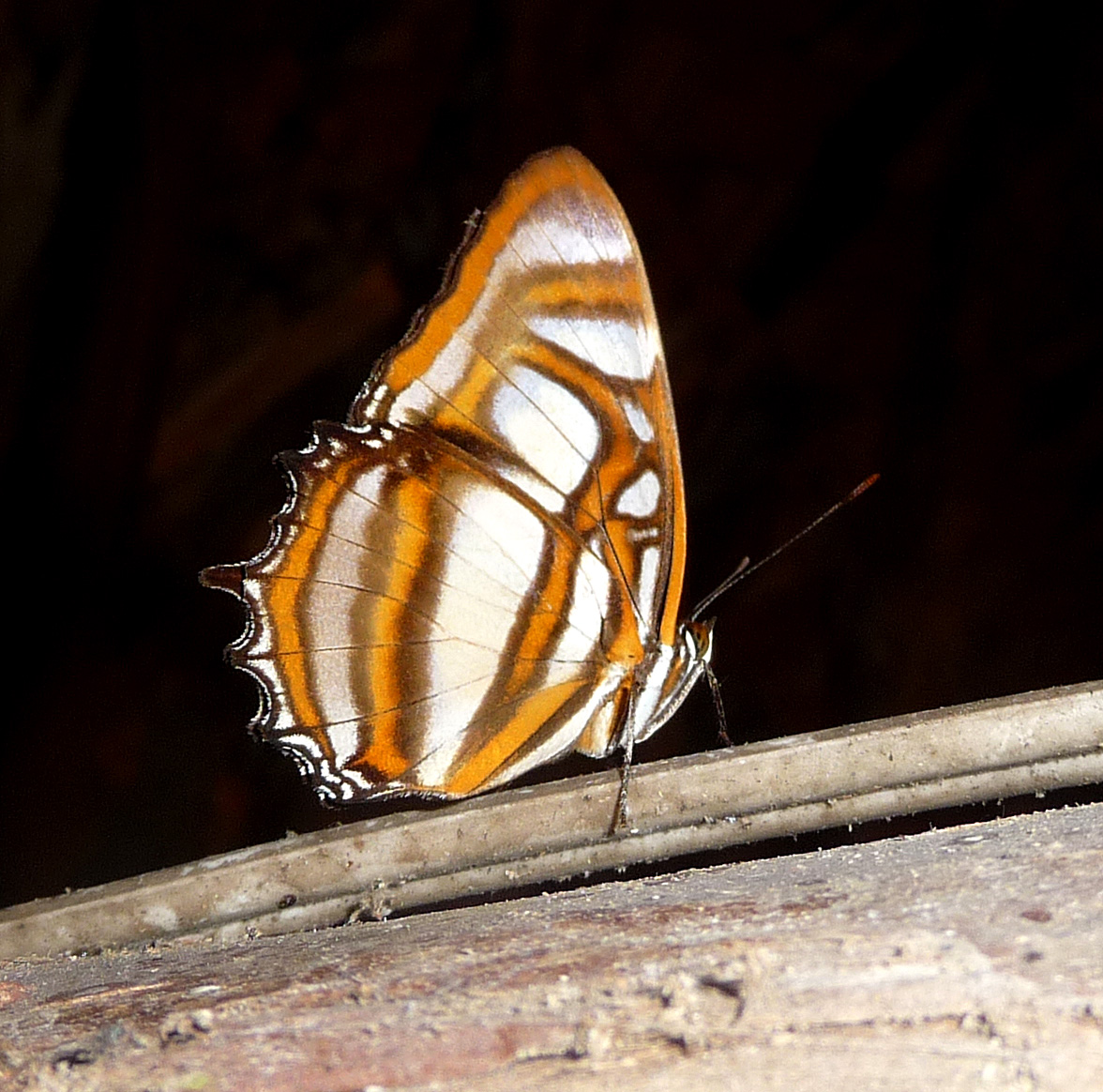

Scientific classification
- Kingdom: Animalia
- Phylum: Arthropoda
- Clade: Pancrustacea
- Class: Insecta
- Order: Lepidoptera
- Family: Nymphalidae
- Tribe: Victorinini
- Genus: Metamorpha; Hübner, [1819]
- Species: M. elissa

Binomial name
- Metamorpha elissa Hübner, [1819]

= Metamorpha =

Genus of butterflies

Metamorpha is a monotypic butterfly genus in the family Nymphalinae. Its one species, Metamorpha elissa, is found in Suriname.
