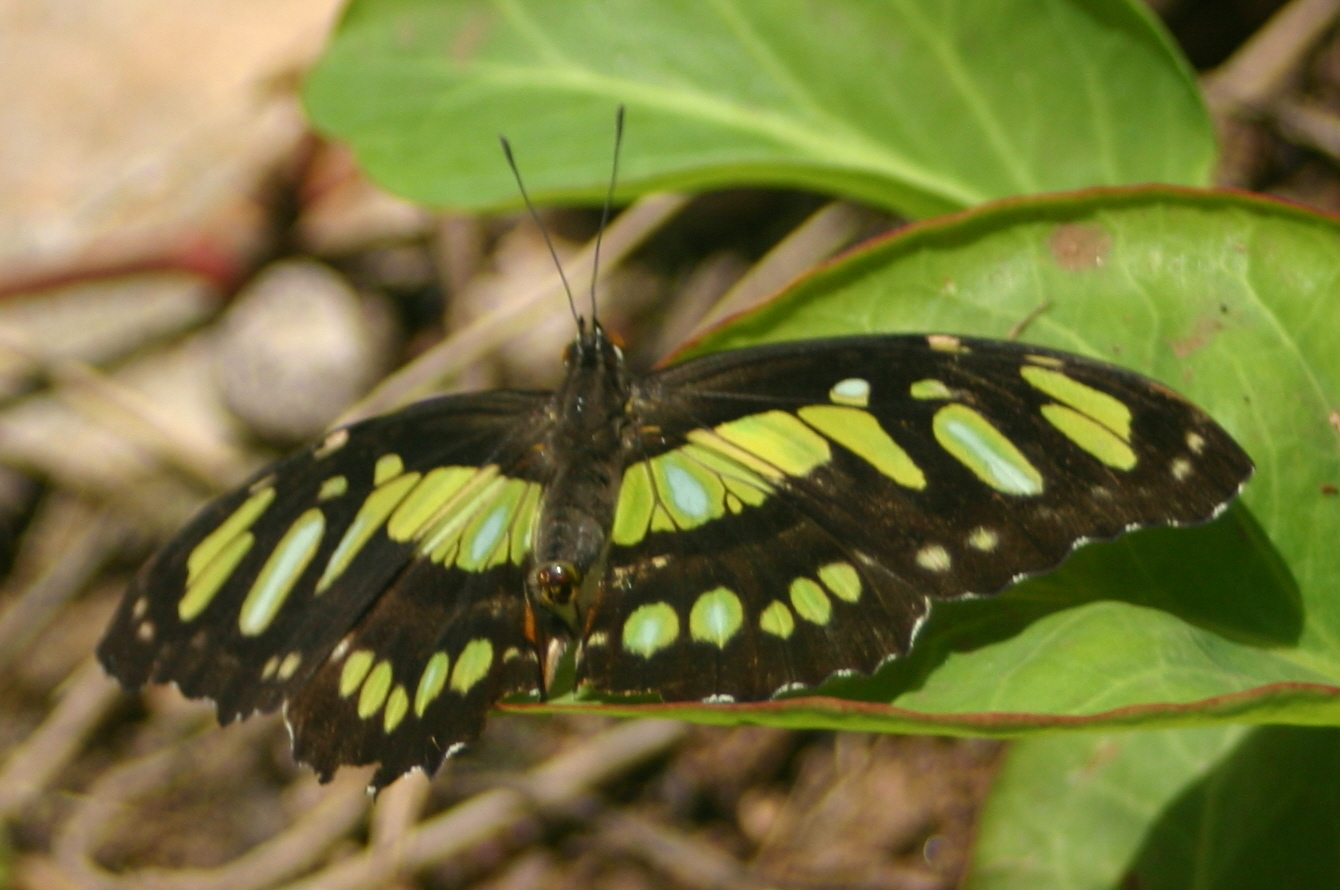
- Malachite (Siproeta stelenes)

Scientific classification
- Kingdom: Animalia
- Phylum: Arthropoda
- Class: Insecta
- Order: Lepidoptera
- Family: Nymphalidae
- Tribe: Victorinini
- Genus: Siproeta; Hübner, 1823

= Siproeta =

Genus of butterflies

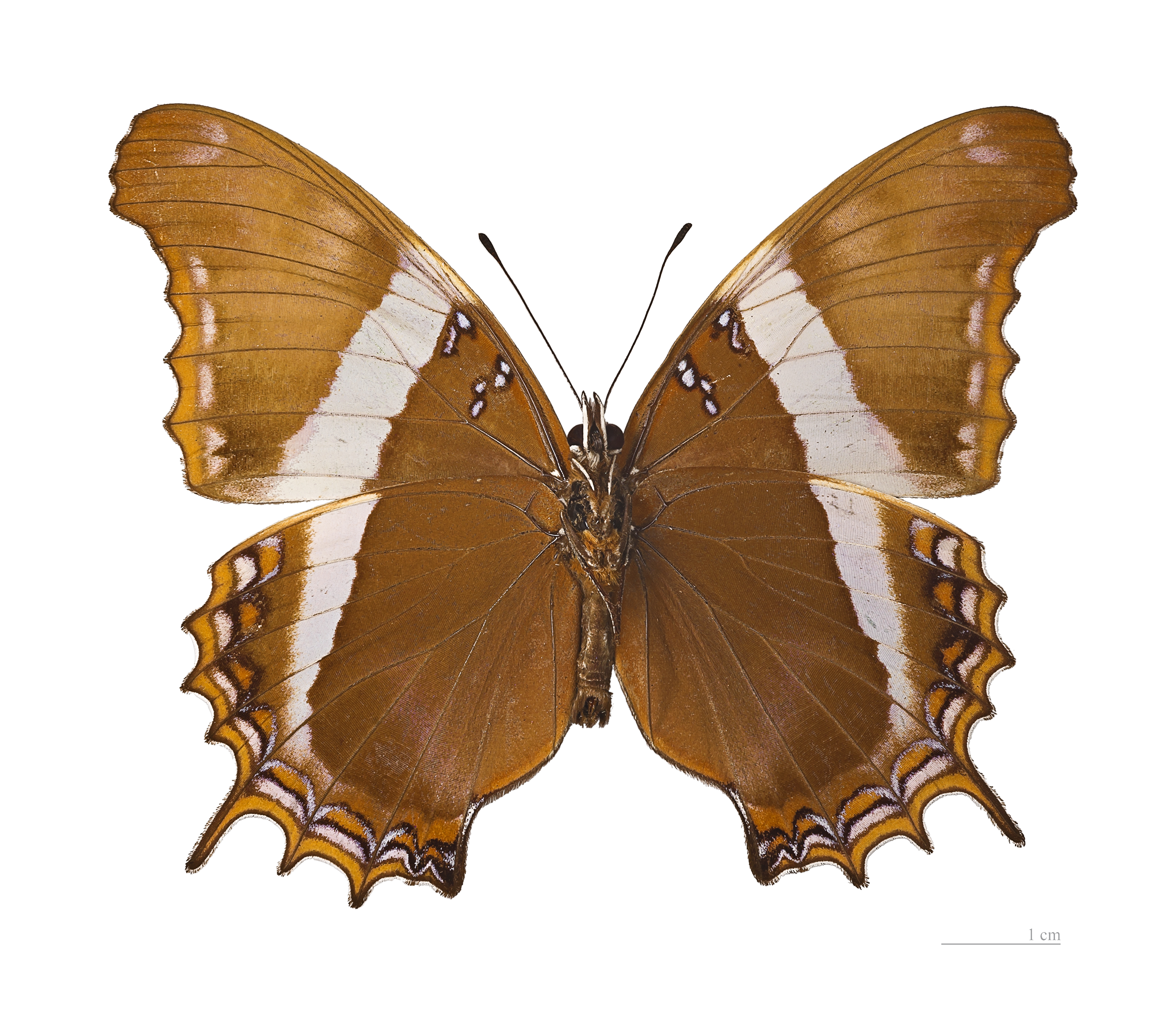
Siproeta superba

Siproeta is a genus of butterflies in the family Nymphalidae found in Central America, the Caribbean, and South America.

== Species ==
There are three recognised species:

Image	Scientific name	Common name	Distribution
	Siproeta epaphus (Latreille, 1813)	rusty-tipped page	From Texas and Florida to Cuba and Brazil
	Siproeta stelenes (Linnaeus, 1758)	malachite	Central America, lower tip of North American and upper part of South America
	Siproeta superba (Bates, 1864)	broad-banded page	South Mexico & Guatemala
