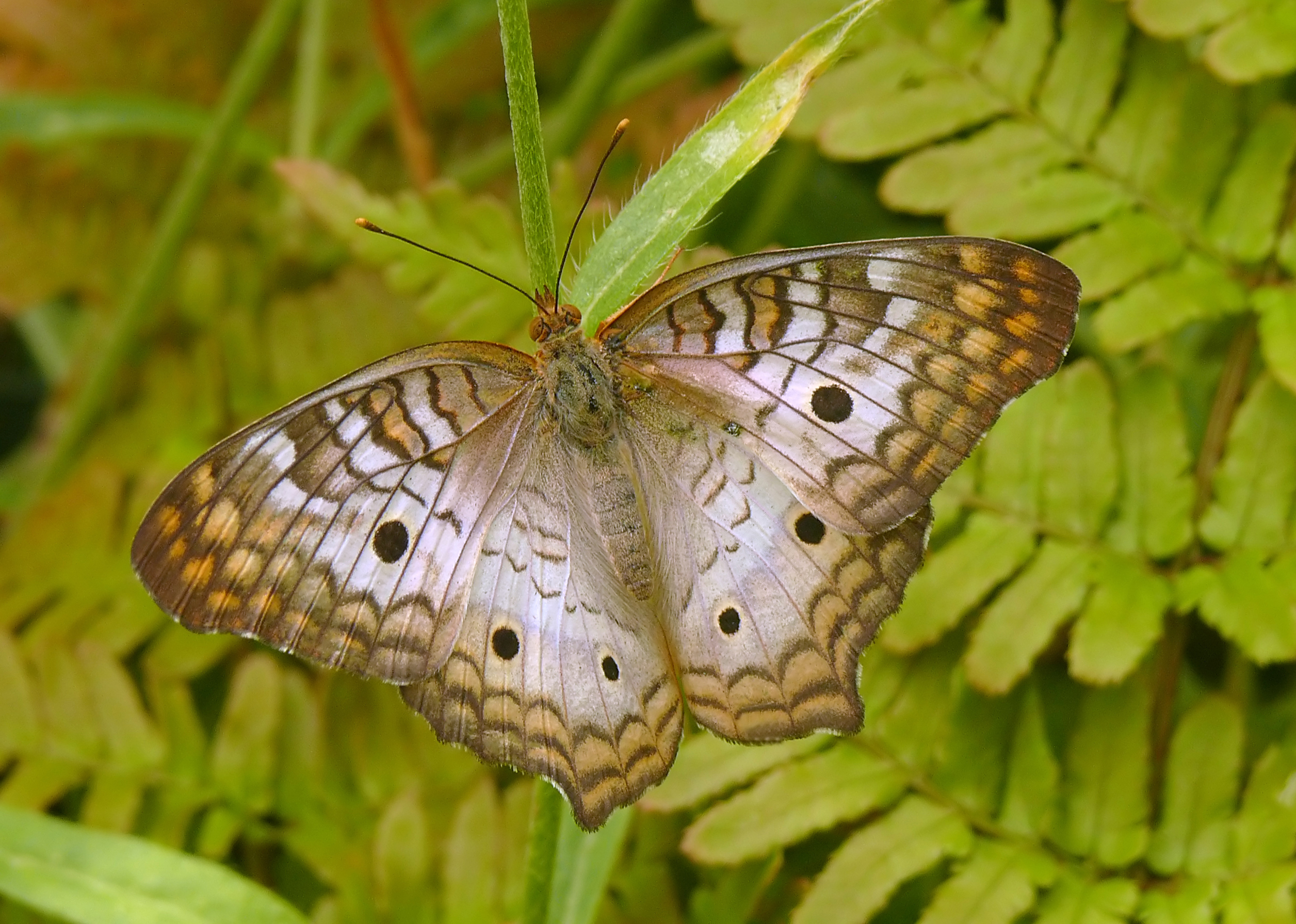
- White peacock (Anartia jatrophae)

Scientific classification
- Kingdom: Animalia
- Phylum: Arthropoda
- Clade: Pancrustacea
- Class: Insecta
- Order: Lepidoptera
- Family: Nymphalidae
- Tribe: Victorinini
- Genus: Anartia; Hübner, 1819

Type species
- Anaria jatrophae (Linnaeus, 1763)

Species
- Five, see text

= Anartia =

Genus of butterflies

Anartia is a genus of butterflies in family Nymphalidae, and subfamily Nymphalinae, found in tropical and subtropical areas in the Americas. The butterflies are known as peacocks, although the common European peacock (Aglais io) is not in the same genus.

== Species ==
Listed alphabetically.

Image	Scientific name	Common name	Distribution
	Anartia amathea (Linnaeus, 1758)	brown peacock or scarlet peacock	Panama to Argentina; Grenada, Barbados and Antigua
	Anartia chrysopelea Hübner, [1831]	Cuban peacock or Caribbean peacock	Cuba
	Anartia fatima (Fabricius, 1793)	banded peacock or Fatima	south Texas, Mexico, and Central America
	Anartia jatrophae (Linnaeus, 1763)	white peacock or masote	southeastern United States, Central America, and throughout much of South America.
	Anartia lytrea (Godart, 1819)	Godart's peacock or Hispaniolan peacock	Hispaniola and the Swan Islands of Honduras
