= Anartia lytrea =

Godart's peacock

Scientific classification
- Kingdom: Animalia
- Phylum: Arthropoda
- Clade: Pancrustacea
- Class: Insecta
- Order: Lepidoptera
- Family: Nymphalidae
- Genus: Anartia
- Species: A. lytrea

Binomial name
- Anartia lytrea (Godart, 1819)

Species of butterfly

Anartia lytrea, or Godart's peacock, is a species of nymphalid butterfly found on Hispaniola and the Swan Islands of Honduras. It is a rare stray on Cuba. The butterfly has been known to occasionally stray into the lower keys of Florida.
