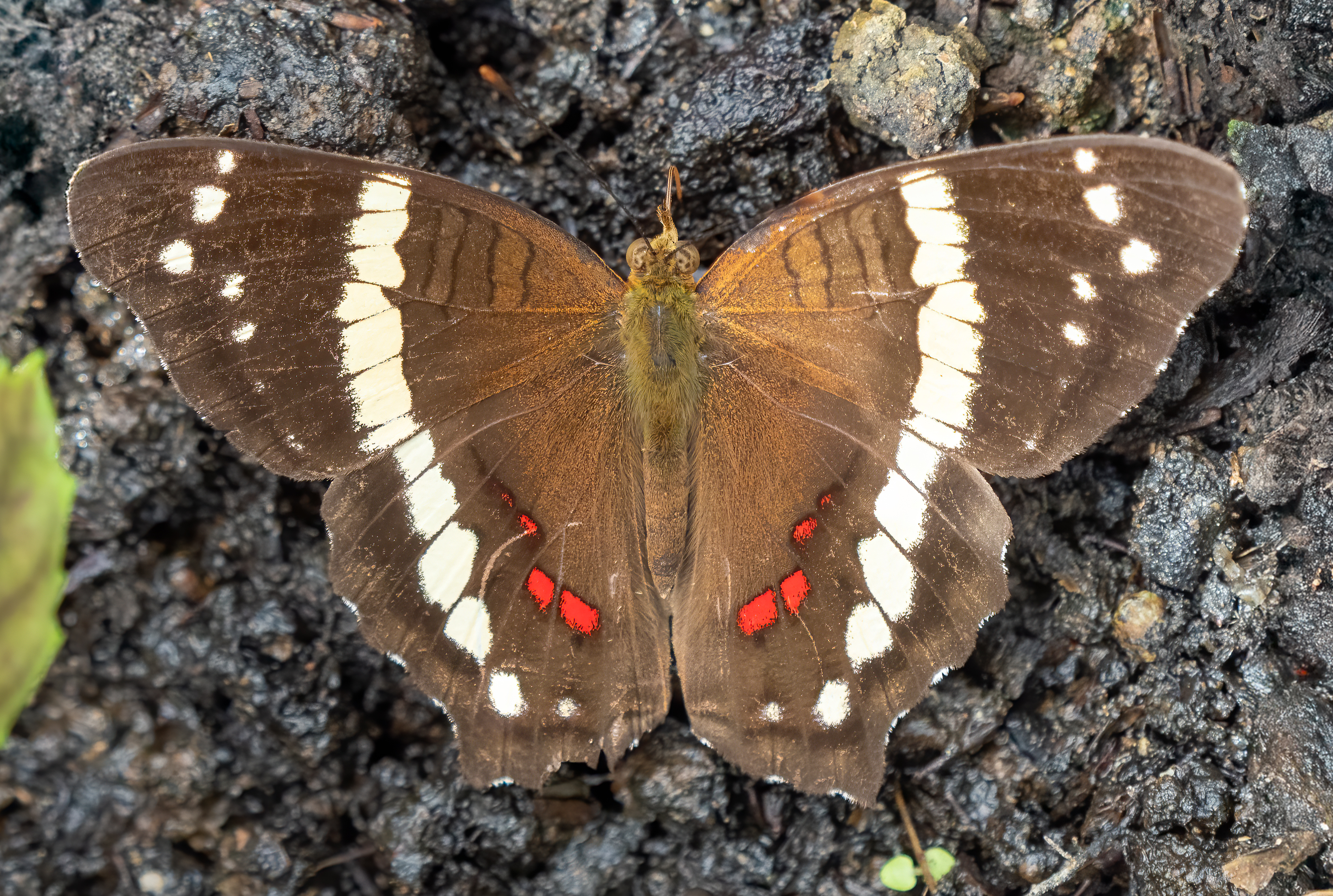

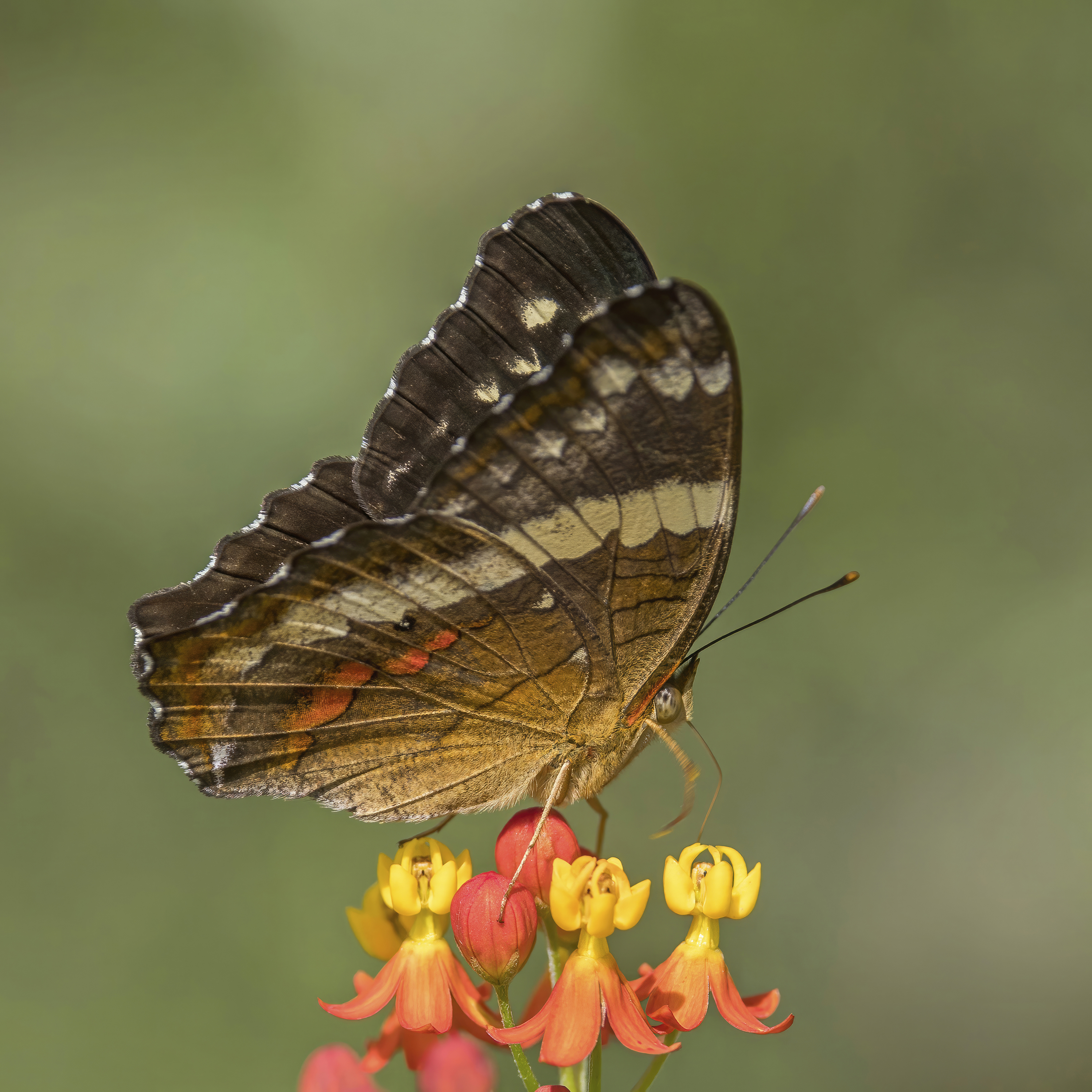

Scientific classification
- Kingdom: Animalia
- Phylum: Arthropoda
- Clade: Pancrustacea
- Class: Insecta
- Order: Lepidoptera
- Family: Nymphalidae
- Genus: Anartia
- Species: A. fatima

Binomial name
- Anartia fatima (Fabricius, 1793)

= Anartia fatima =

Banded peacock

Species of butterfly

Anartia fatima, the banded peacock, is a butterfly in the family Nymphalidae. It is commonly found in south Texas, Mexico, and Central America but most studied in Costa Rica. This butterfly prefers subtropical climates and moist areas, such as near rivers. It spends much of its time in second-growth woodlands.

Its larvae feed on plants in the family Acanthaceae, while adults primarily feed on flower nectar from Acanthus species. The species is diurnal. These butterflies face interspecies competition for nectar with other butterflies and must also compete with hummingbirds, who will chase them away.

The eggs are laid in low-lying host plant leaves and flower bracts. Several hundred are laid by a single female within the span of a few days, with only a small percentage of the eggs surviving to adulthood. Eggs take five days to hatch and the larvae complete six instar phases before pupation. After pupation is complete, adults emerge and fly off within 1–2 hours.

This butterfly is not toxic to predators. It is the victim of predation by many bird, lizard, frog, and arthropod species. However, this butterfly is so ubiquitous that losses from predation do not endanger the species.

== Geographic range ==
Although Anartia fatima has been recorded once as far north as Kansas, its range generally begins in southern Texas and continues south through Mexico and all of Central America and Panama. It is ubiquitous throughout its range. In South America, A. fatima is no longer found and a closely related species, Anartia amathea, becomes prevalent.

== Habitat ==
This butterfly prefers subtropical open areas and previously disturbed places, such as second-growth areas, from sea level to 1,500 meters. Its host plants of preference are herbaceous and are primarily restricted to the species in a single family, Acanthaceae. Some common examples of its host plants are Blechum, Justicia, Dicliptera, and Ruellia. The banded peacock exists in extensive tracts of forest in small populations along the banks of rivers. This suggests that individuals disperse across long distances.

== Home range and territoriality ==
From late morning until early afternoon, males perch on low vegetation and chase other male butterflies away from their territory. The males fly in a slow zig-zag pattern between 0.3 and 0.6 meters above ground to patrol the area around their territory and seek females. In this territory, the male will search for mates and receive most of his nutritional requirements from flowers.

== Food resources ==
=== Caterpillars ===
==== Host plant preferences ====
Larvae feed on the host plant vegetation. In South Texas, there is a preference for Ruellia, but continuing southward any other Acanthaceae will suffice.

=== Adults ===
==== Adult diet ====
The adults feed on flower nectar from Acanthus and other flower nectars. Males arise earlier than females to begin their search for food and prepare their search for female mates. Females do not venture out until there is more sunlight.

==== Pollination ====
In the process of feeding on the flower nectar from Acanthus and other plants, the butterflies pollinate these plants by picking up and depositing pollen as they moved from flower to flower.

== Parental care ==
=== Oviposition ===
Single eggs are laid on leaf surfaces or between flower bracts on host plants, such as Blechum. Females have been observed to oviposit on the leaf surfaces of low-growing Hydrocotyle and Spermacoce assurgens growing near small patches of Blechum. Ovipositions lasted for 5–10 seconds each. Each time a female lands on a host plant, she quickly oviposits and takes off, landing again on the next host plant she encounters. Females have high fecundity and can lay several hundred eggs over the course of a few days.

== Social behavior ==
=== Adult sociality ===
Sets of adults seek shelter, feed, and mate within the same areas. However, no forms of social grouping are observed. These butterflies exhibit roosting behavior on the undersides of leaves in late evening, perching upside-down with wings closed. It is thought that the purpose of this behavior is to remain hidden from predators.

== Life cycle ==
=== Eggs ===
The spherical eggs are approximately 1 mm in diameter. They hatch after approximately 5 days.

=== Larvae ===
The larvae go through 6 instar phases, each lasting different periods of time and accompanied by changes in physiology. The stages last on average 3.25, 3.06, 2.81, 3.13, 3.31, and 6.88 days, respectively.

=== Pupae ===
After these stages are complete, a larva nearing pupation will wander for about one day and then prepare a silk pupation platform several centimeters above the ground on the bottom of a leaf or twig. The pupal period will last between 6 and 8 days, after which the organism has transitioned to the adult butterfly phase.

=== Adult ===
Adult butterflies will emerge in the morning and will be ready to fly within one to two hours. The adults wings are dark brown above, with four or five red spots of varying sizes located on the basal portion of the hindwing. A bold light-colored median band runs across both the forewing and hindwing, as well as seven small spots near the apex and post-median area of the forewing. Polymorphism can be seen in the color of these markings as some individuals are white-banded and others yellow-banded. Males and females are similar, although females tend to have more diffusely edged pattern elements.

== Migration ==
Banded peacock butterflies have a relatively short lifespan and make flights north to South Texas at all times of the year. There are some years, however, when colonies do not make the journey north. In Costa Rica, with the coming of the dry season, this species may migrate southeasterly along the Pacific coast from Guanacaste to Monteverde.

== Enemies ==
The banded peacock is often the subject of predation by birds, lizards, frogs, spiders and other insects. This butterfly is often found with bird and lizard beak marks, resulting from close calls with predators.

== Protective coloration and behavior ==
Within the family Lepidoptera, the banded peacock is one of the most palatable species to predators and is often used as a control food item in experiments studying warning coloration and mimicry. Although vertical stripes are usually a sign of chemically protected species, the banded peacock does not seem to gain any protection from its striped coloration.

== Genetics of color patterns ==
The genetic basis of the polymorphism between white and yellow band color is still unknown; however, studies have shown a difference in mate selection in different seasons. In the dry season, white-banded females attract both white and yellow males about twice as often as yellow-banded females. In the wet season, mate selection return to 1:1 proportions.

== Mating ==
=== Female/male interactions ===
==== Courting ====
When a male in the course of his flight activity sees a female banded peacock butterfly, he dives down to the other butterfly. If the female butterfly flies up, the male will chase after her for some distance. If the female does not fly up, the male will fly very close to the female and flutter his wings above her for about thirty seconds. This is known as the approach behavior of the male. If the female is a virgin, she will close her wings over her thorax and expose her abdomen in preparation for a lateral approach by the male. The male will then position his abdomen for copulation by curving it around his head and then walk up to the female in parallel orientation to initiate coupling.

== Interspecific competition ==
The banded peacock is in direct competition for flower nectar with other butterfly species as well as with hummingbirds. Many hummingbirds are territorial over a foraging area and will chase away and pursue intruders, such as the banded peacock. As a result, the banded peacock is in direct competition with this species, and it is a relationship in which the butterfly can only evade and cannot fight back to continue foraging in the area.

== Conservation ==
This butterfly is ubiquitous in the regions in inhabits. It suffers little consequence from predation and human factors. Its migratory patterns are not threatened by any causes.
