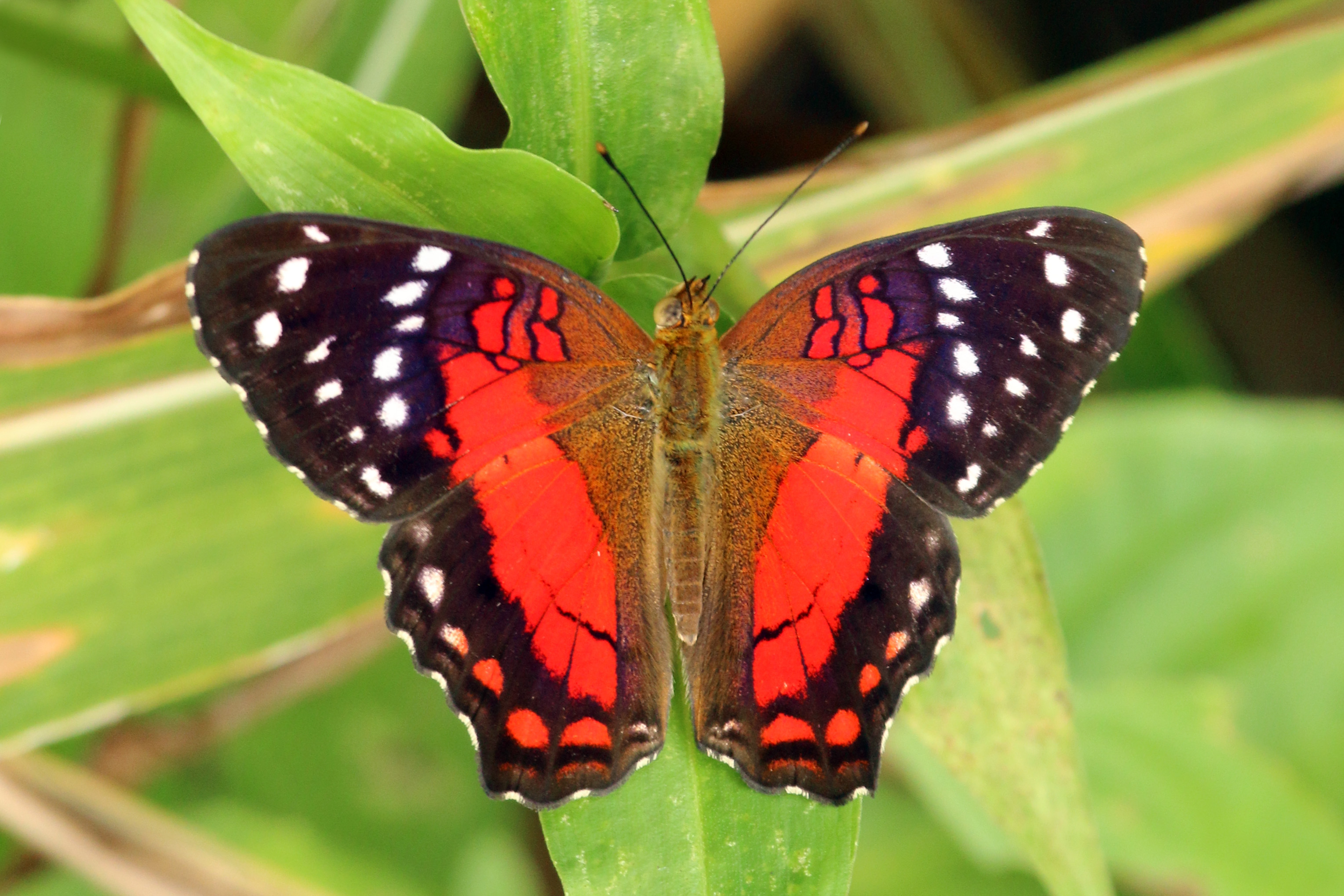
- Male, Tobago
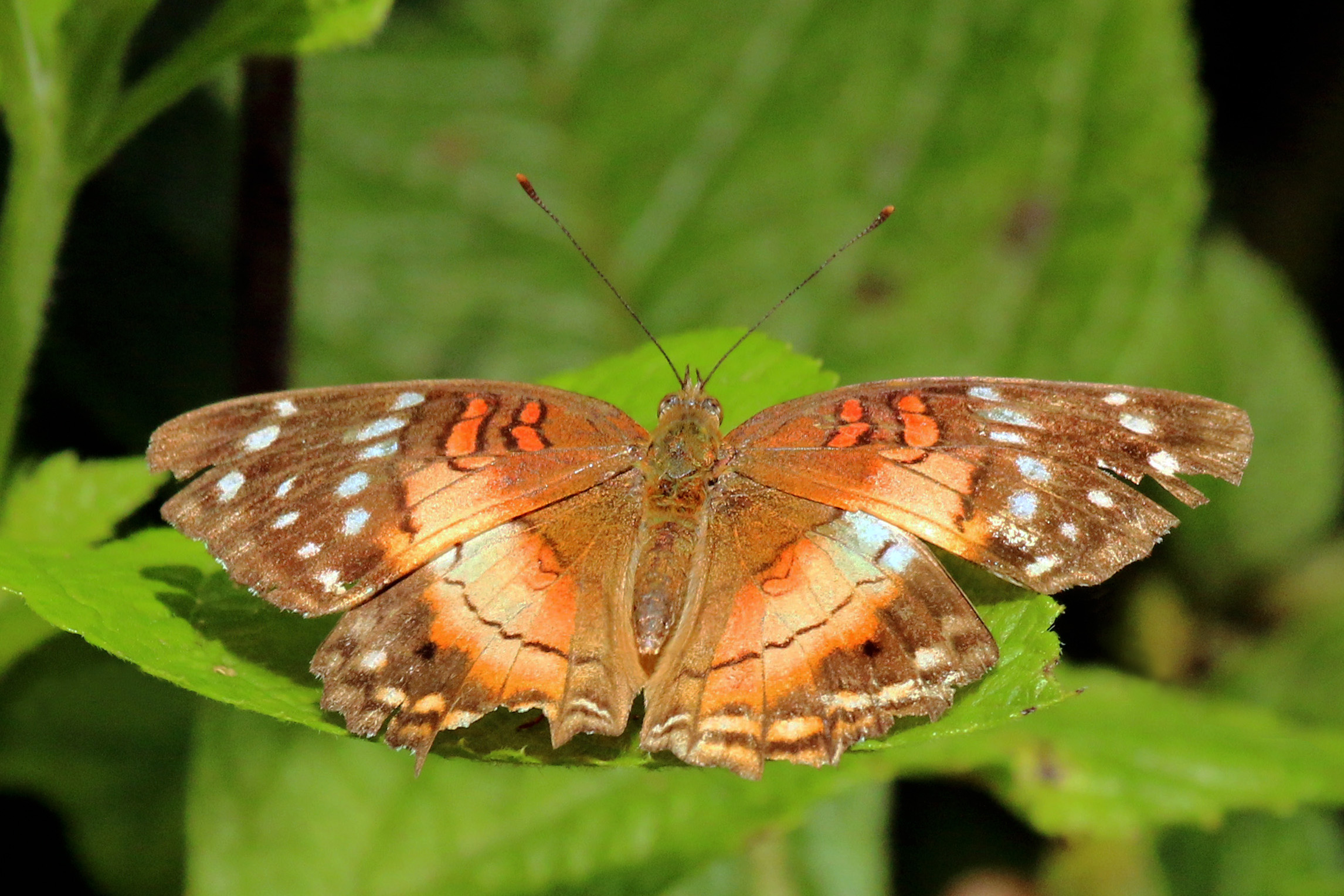
- Female, Trinidad

Scientific classification
- Kingdom: Animalia
- Phylum: Arthropoda
- Class: Insecta
- Order: Lepidoptera
- Family: Nymphalidae
- Genus: Anartia
- Species: A. amathea

Binomial name
- Anartia amathea (Linnaeus, 1758)

= Anartia amathea =

Species of butterfly

Anartia amathea, the brown peacock (scarlet peacock, red peacock), is a species of nymphalid butterfly, found primarily in South America. This butterfly is very similar to the banded peacock or Anartia fatima, which primarily exists north of the range of Anartia amathea. The type locality is probably Suriname, and the species is found from Panama to Argentina; Grenada, Barbados and Antigua. It consumes nectar. It is reported as common in Argentina, Paraguay, Uruguay, the Brazilian highlands, the eastern Amazon, the Guianas, Venezuela, and Panama, as well as Trinidad and other Caribbean islands. North American records are either in error or refer to strays.

Larval host plants are mostly undetermined, but these include the families Acanthaceae and Labiatae.

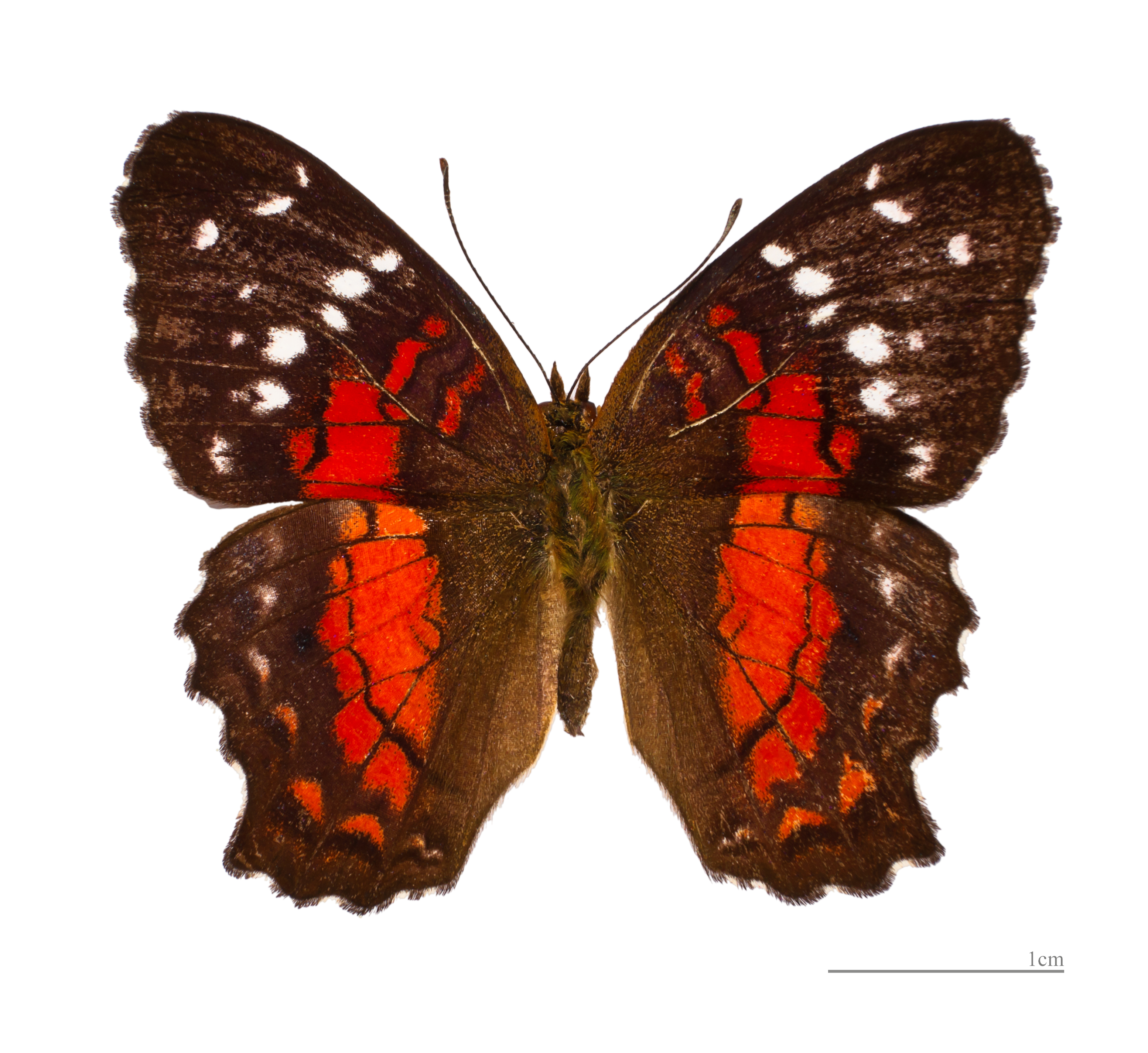
Anartia amathea, dorsal view (MHNT)

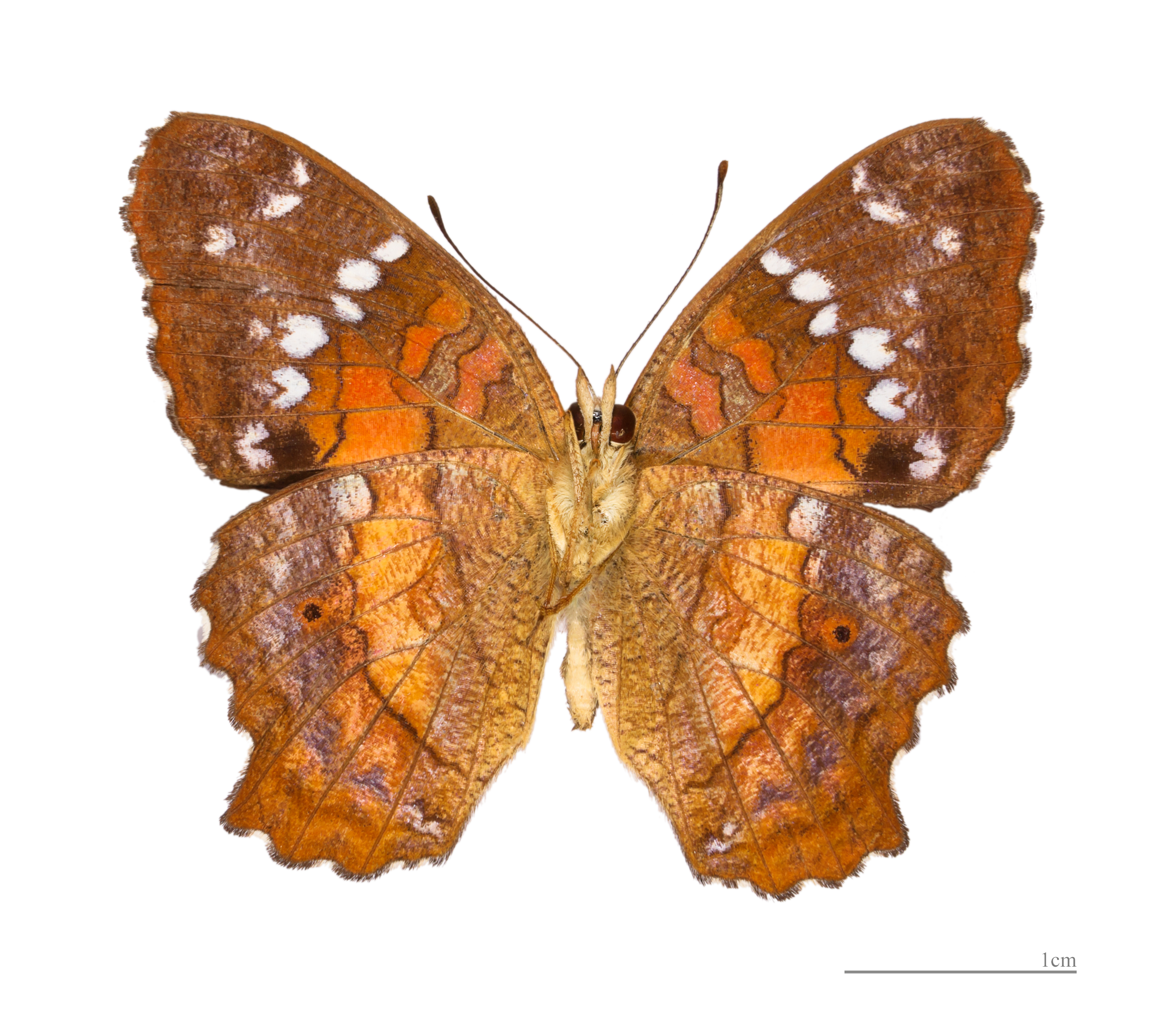
Anartia amathea, ventral view (MHNT)

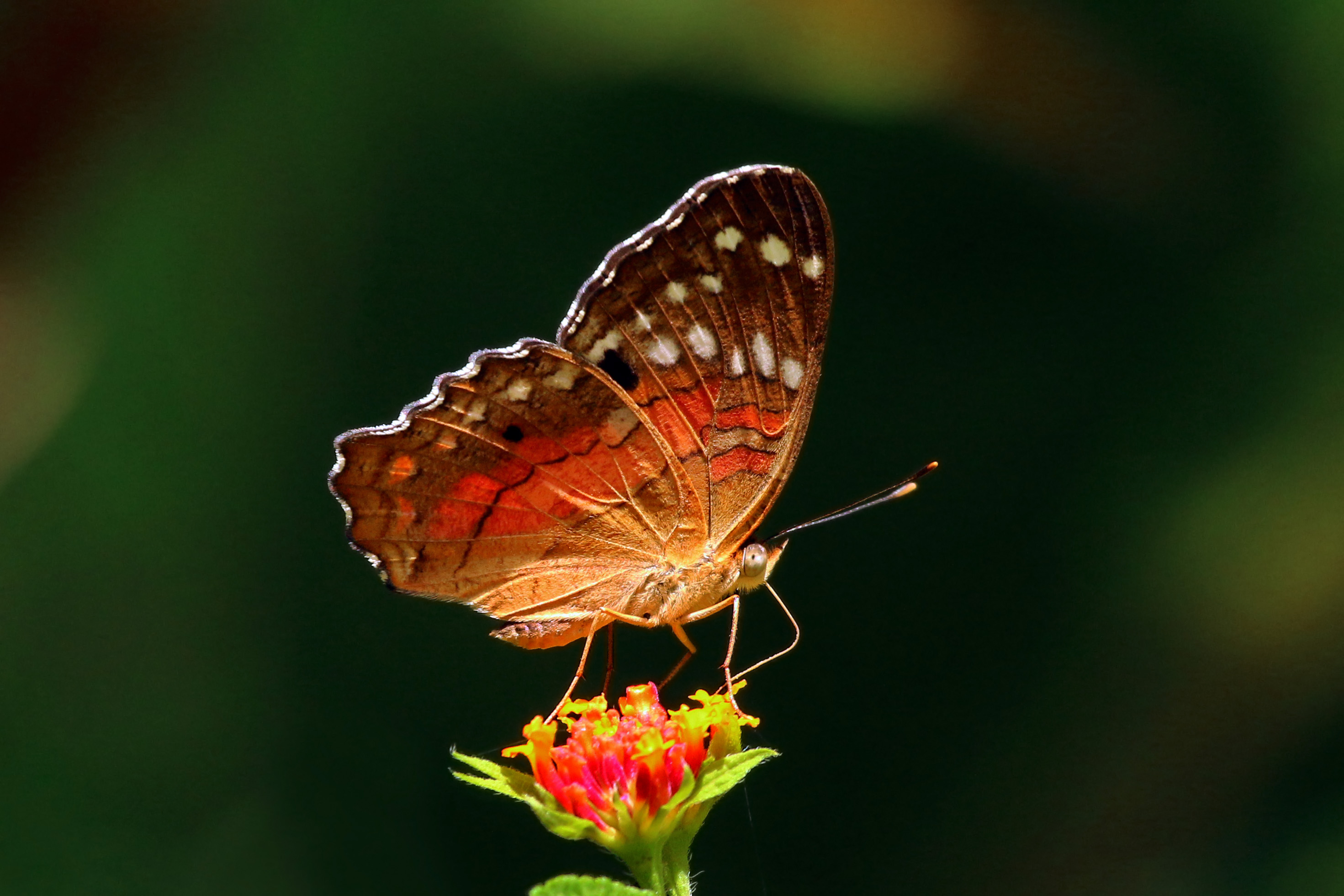
Male, underside, Trinidad

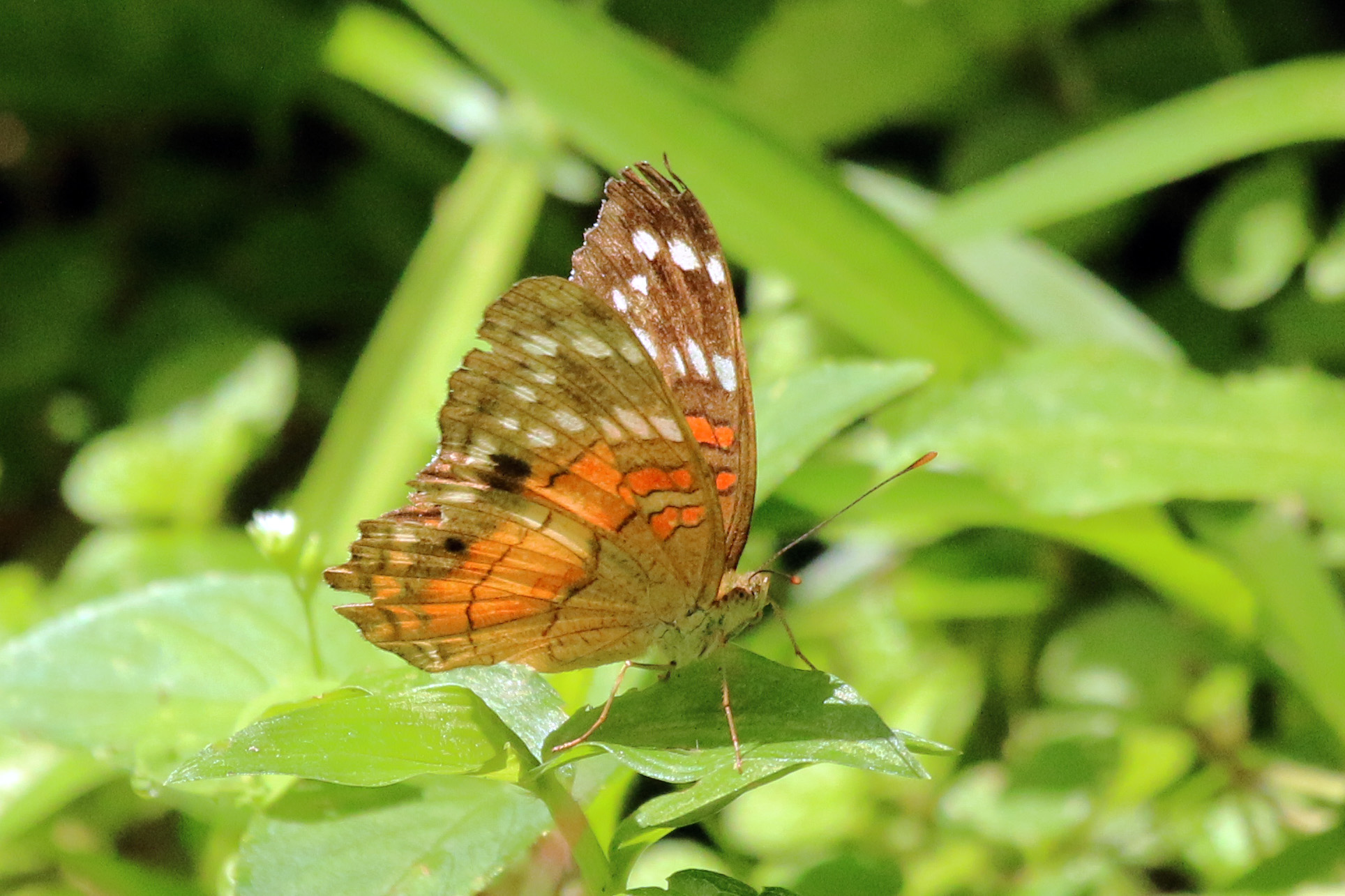
Female, underside, Trinidad
