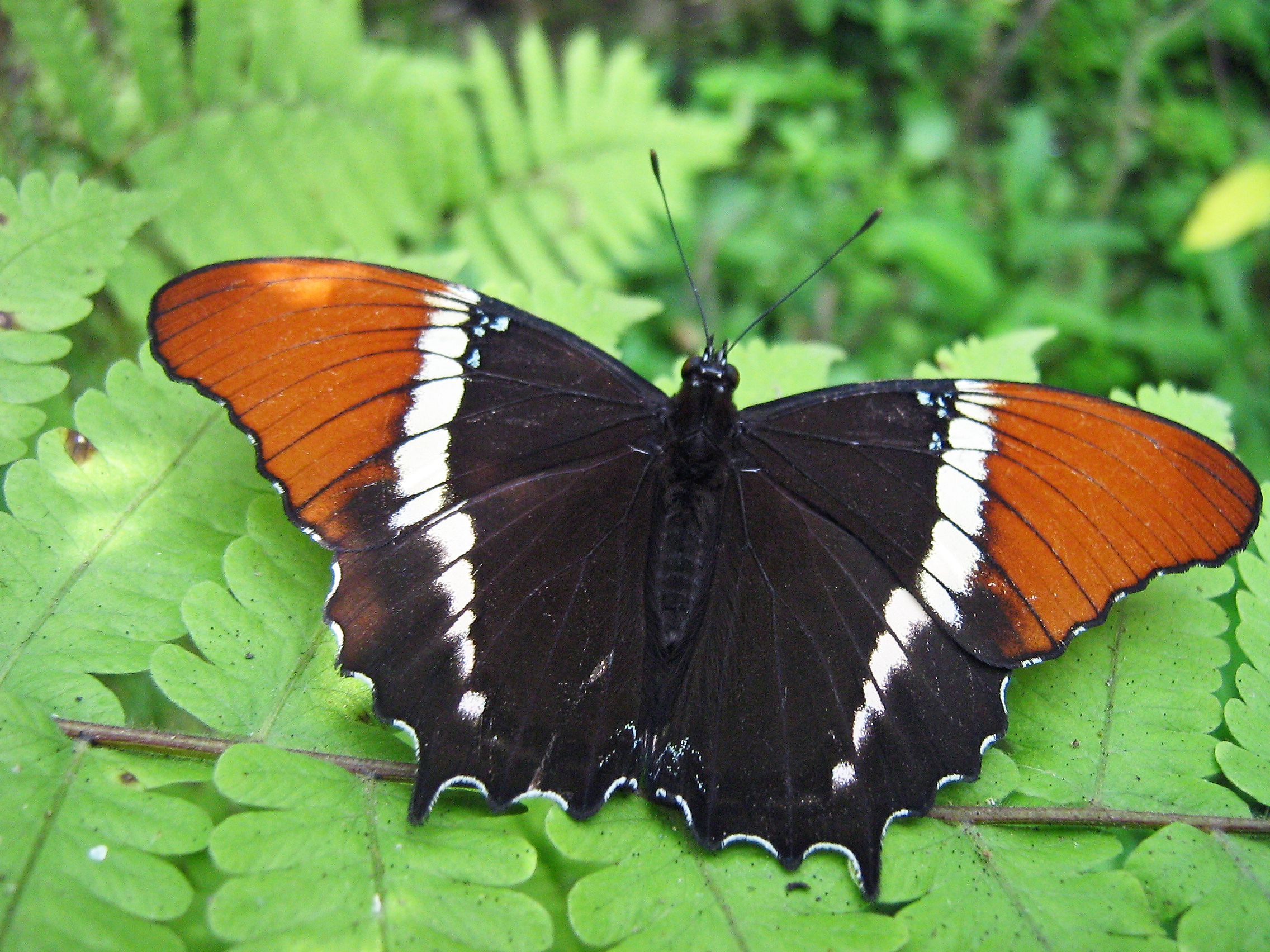

Scientific classification
- Domain: Eukaryota
- Kingdom: Animalia
- Phylum: Arthropoda
- Class: Insecta
- Order: Lepidoptera
- Family: Nymphalidae
- Genus: Siproeta
- Species: S. epaphus

Binomial name
- Siproeta epaphus (Latreille, [1813])

= Siproeta epaphus =

Rusty-tipped page

Species of butterfly

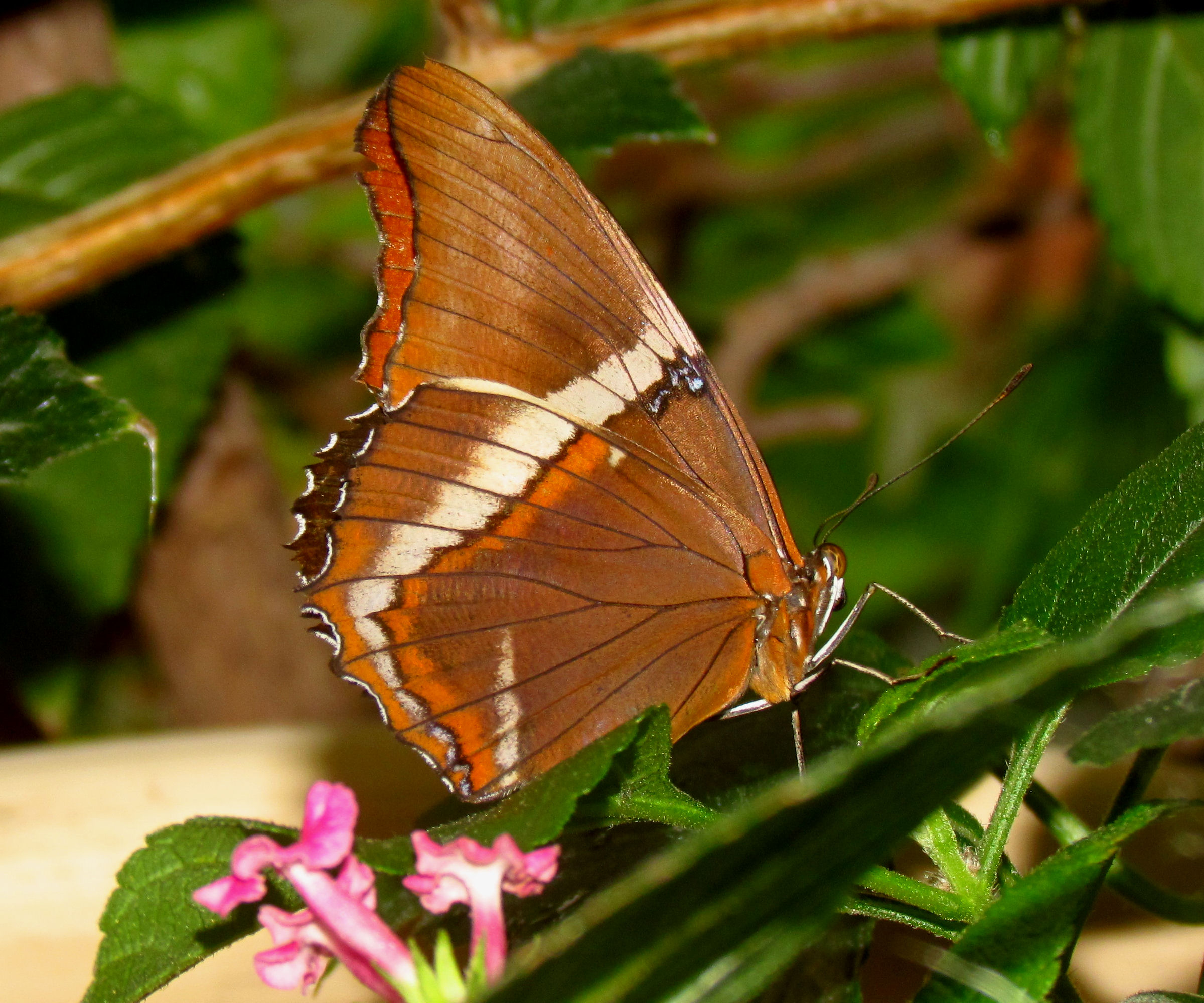
Underside

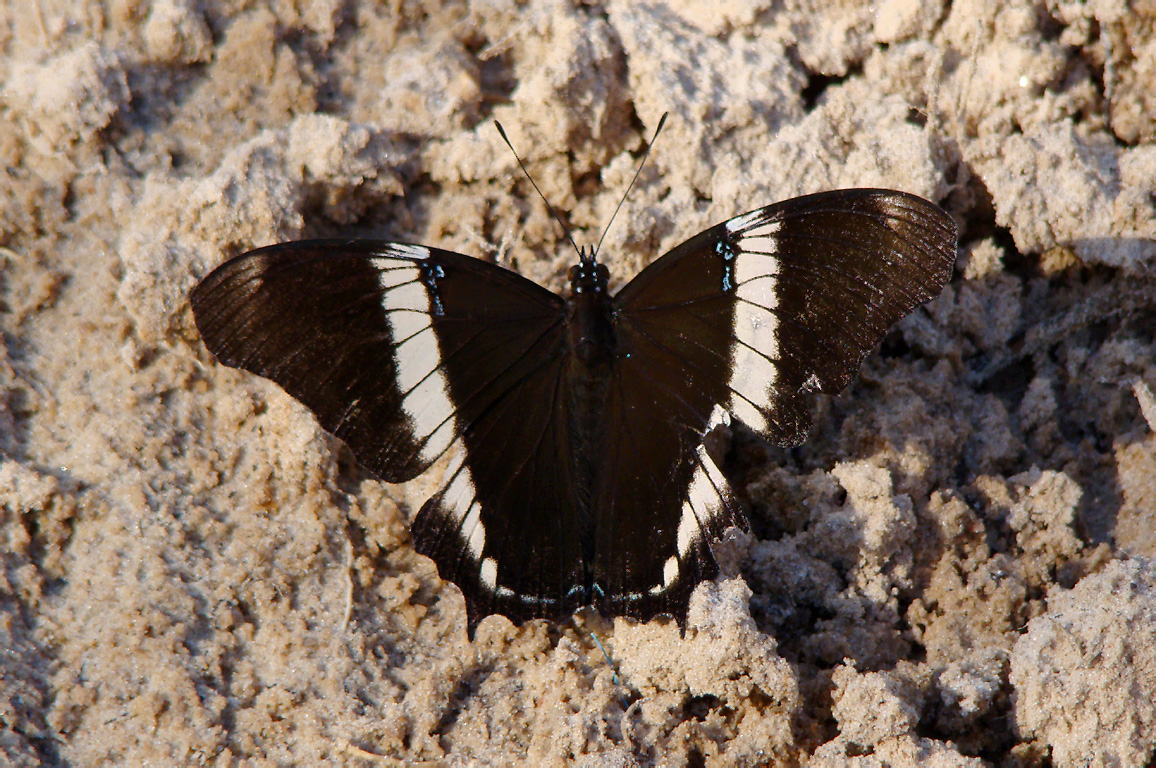
Siproeta epaphus trayja

Siproeta epaphus, the rusty-tipped page or brown siproeta, is a New World butterfly that lives all year in tropical habitats. It has large wings, averaging 7.0–7.5 cm (2.8–3.0 in), that are black in the inner portion of the top surface and brown throughout the underside. Both surfaces have a bold white transverse stripe continuing across both wings. The outer portion of the forewings, beyond the white stripe, is rusty orange in the widespread subspecies S. epaphus epaphus; it is mostly or entirely black in the other two subspecies. S. epaphus is found throughout Central America, where it is one of the most common butterflies. Its range extends from southern North America to central South America. The range includes (though may not be limited to) south Texas and rarely southern New Mexico south through both eastern and western Mexico to the Guyanas, Brazil, Bolivia and Peru.

== Subspecies ==
There are three recognized subspecies:

- S. epaphus epaphus (widespread)
- S. epaphus gadoui (described from Venezuela)
- S. epaphus trayja (described from Brazil, Paraguay)
