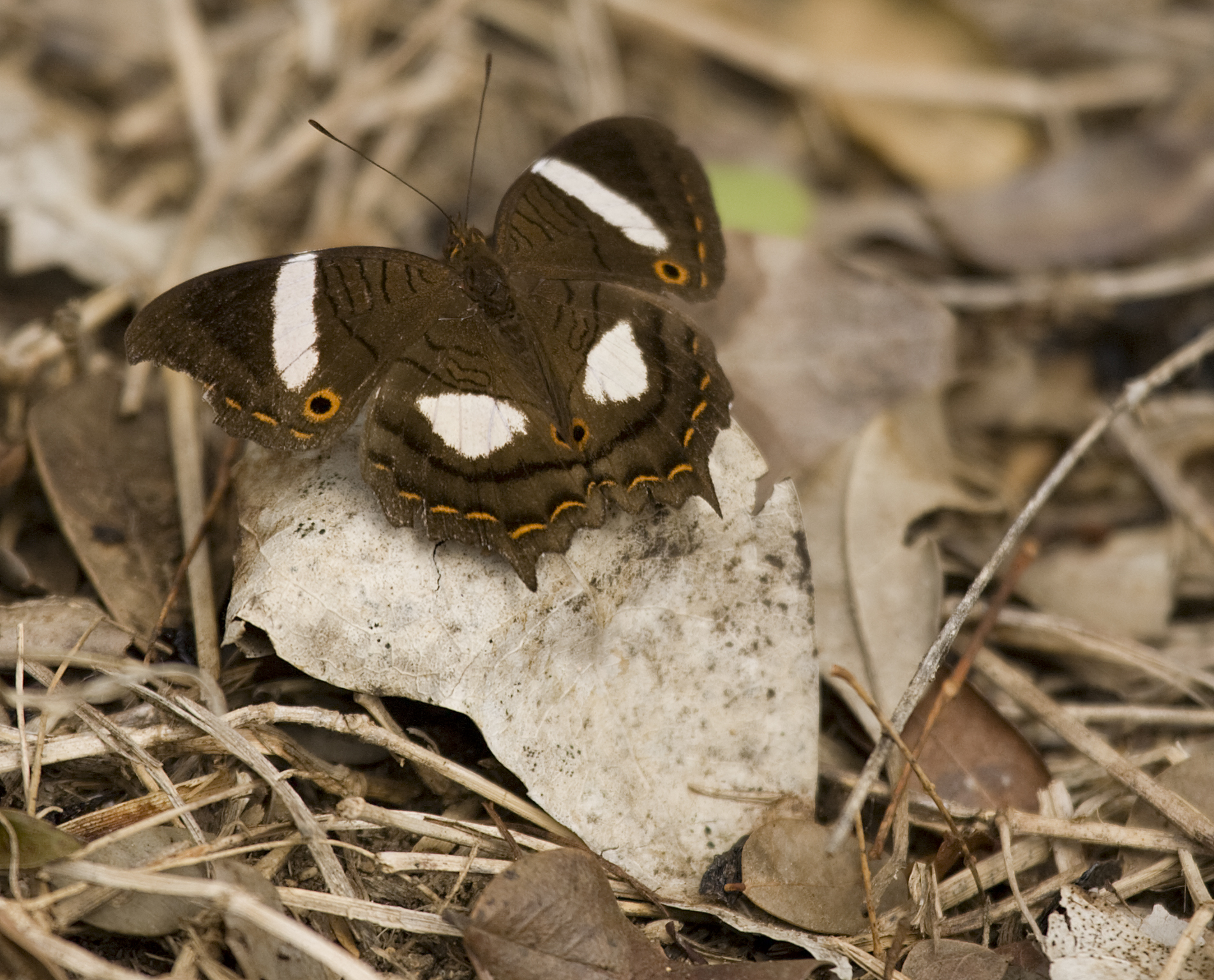

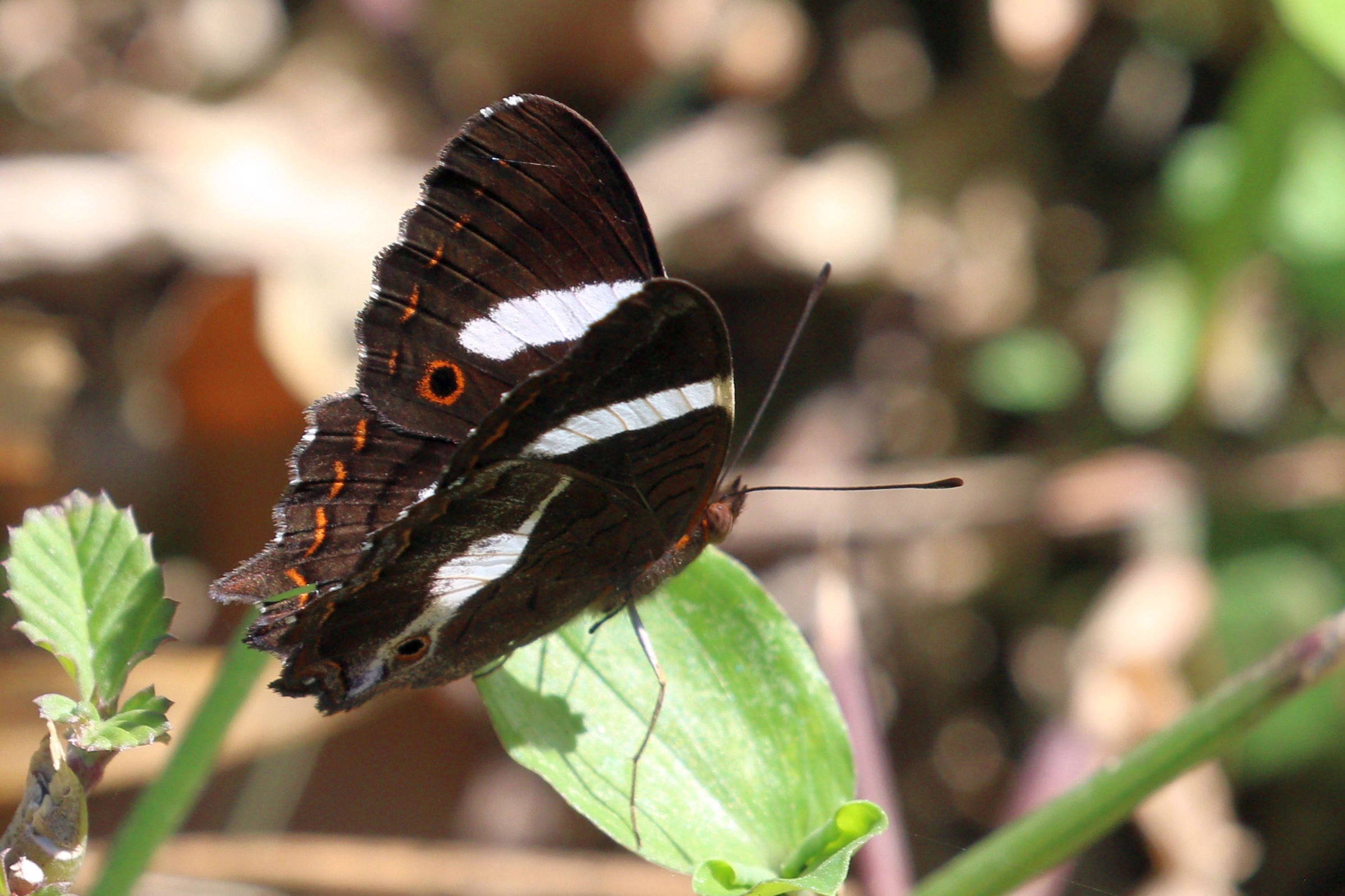
- Both in Cuba

Scientific classification
- Kingdom: Animalia
- Phylum: Arthropoda
- Class: Insecta
- Order: Lepidoptera
- Family: Nymphalidae
- Genus: Anartia
- Species: A. chrysopelea

Binomial name
- Anartia chrysopelea (Hübner, 1831)

= Anartia chrysopelea =

Species of butterfly

Anartia chrysopelea, the Cuban peacock or Caribbean peacock, is a species of butterfly generally only found in Cuba, although stray specimens have been encountered in Monroe County, Florida.
