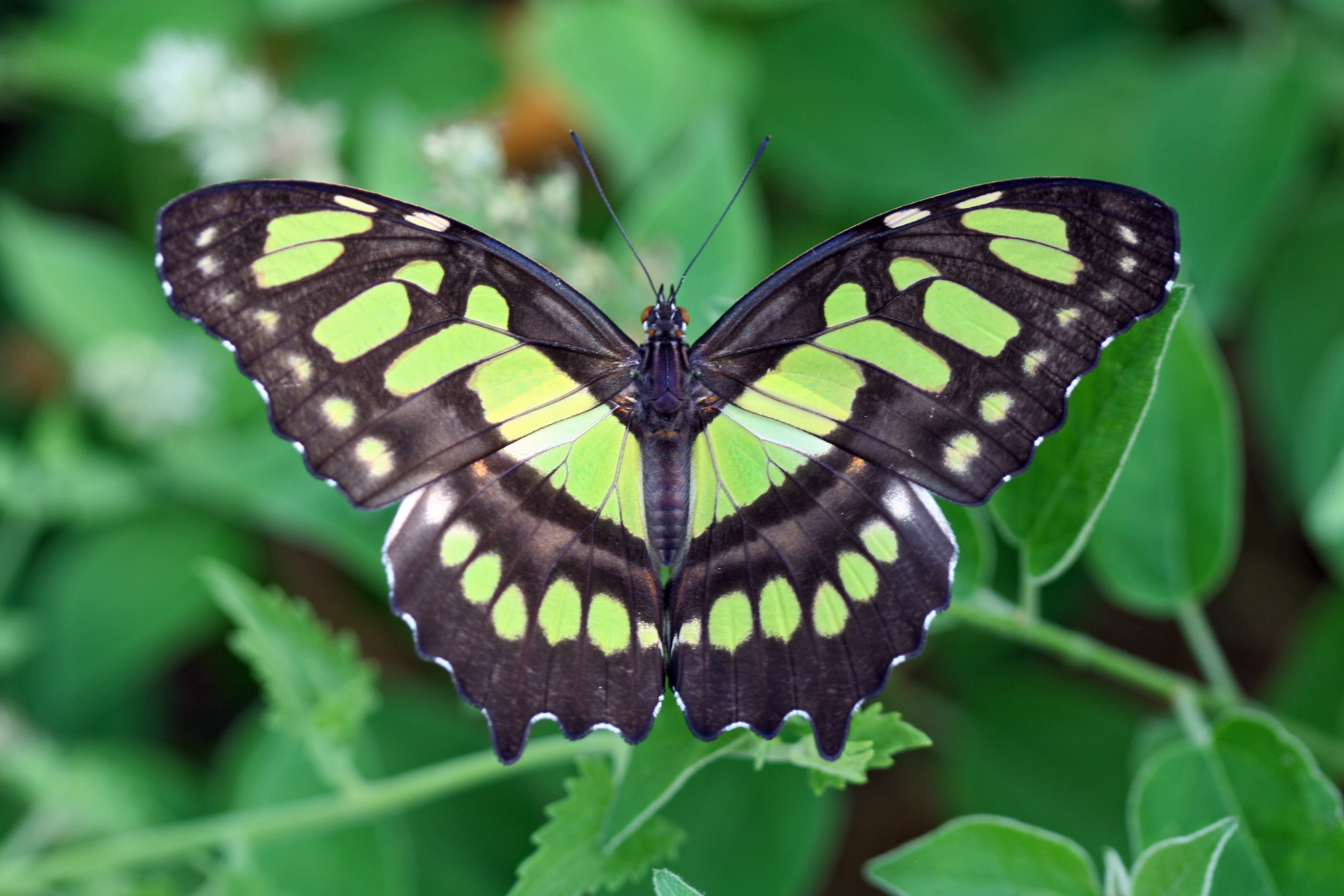

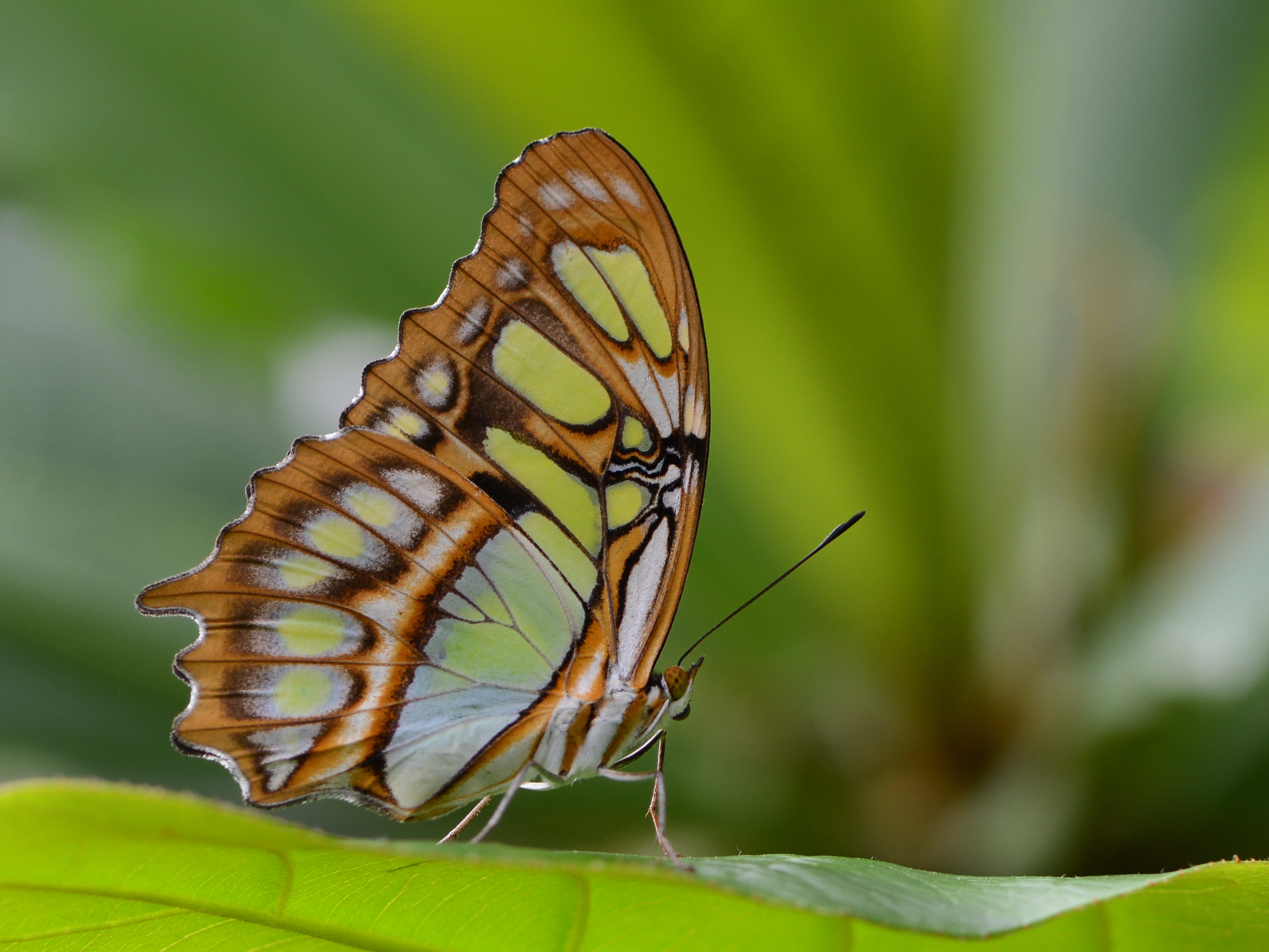

Conservation status
- Secure (NatureServe)

Scientific classification
- Kingdom: Animalia
- Phylum: Arthropoda
- Clade: Pancrustacea
- Class: Insecta
- Order: Lepidoptera
- Family: Nymphalidae
- Genus: Siproeta
- Species: S. stelenes

Binomial name
- Siproeta stelenes (Linnaeus, 1758)

= Siproeta stelenes =

Malachites

Species of butterfly

Siproeta stelenes (malachite) is a Neotropical brush-footed butterfly (family Nymphalidae). The malachite has large wings that are black and brilliant green or yellow-green on the upperside and light brown and olive green on the underside. It is named for the mineral malachite, which is similar in color to the bright green on the butterfly's wings. Typically, the wingspread is between 8.5 and 10 cm (3.3 and 3.9 in). The malachite is found throughout Central and northern South America, where it is one of the most common butterfly species. Its distribution extends as far north as southern Texas and the tip of Florida, to Cuba as subspecies S. s. insularis (Holland, 1916), and S. s. biplagiata, and south to Brazil.

Adults feed on flower nectar, rotting fruit, dead animals, and bat dung. Females lay eggs on the new leaves of plants in the family Acanthaceae, especially Ruellia, Blechum and Plantago. The larvae are horned, spiny, black caterpillars with red markings, The pupal stage is green, with sharp, gold spines that can puncture predators.

Malachites often are confused with the heliconiine Philaethria dido. They have similar coloration, but their wing shapes are different.

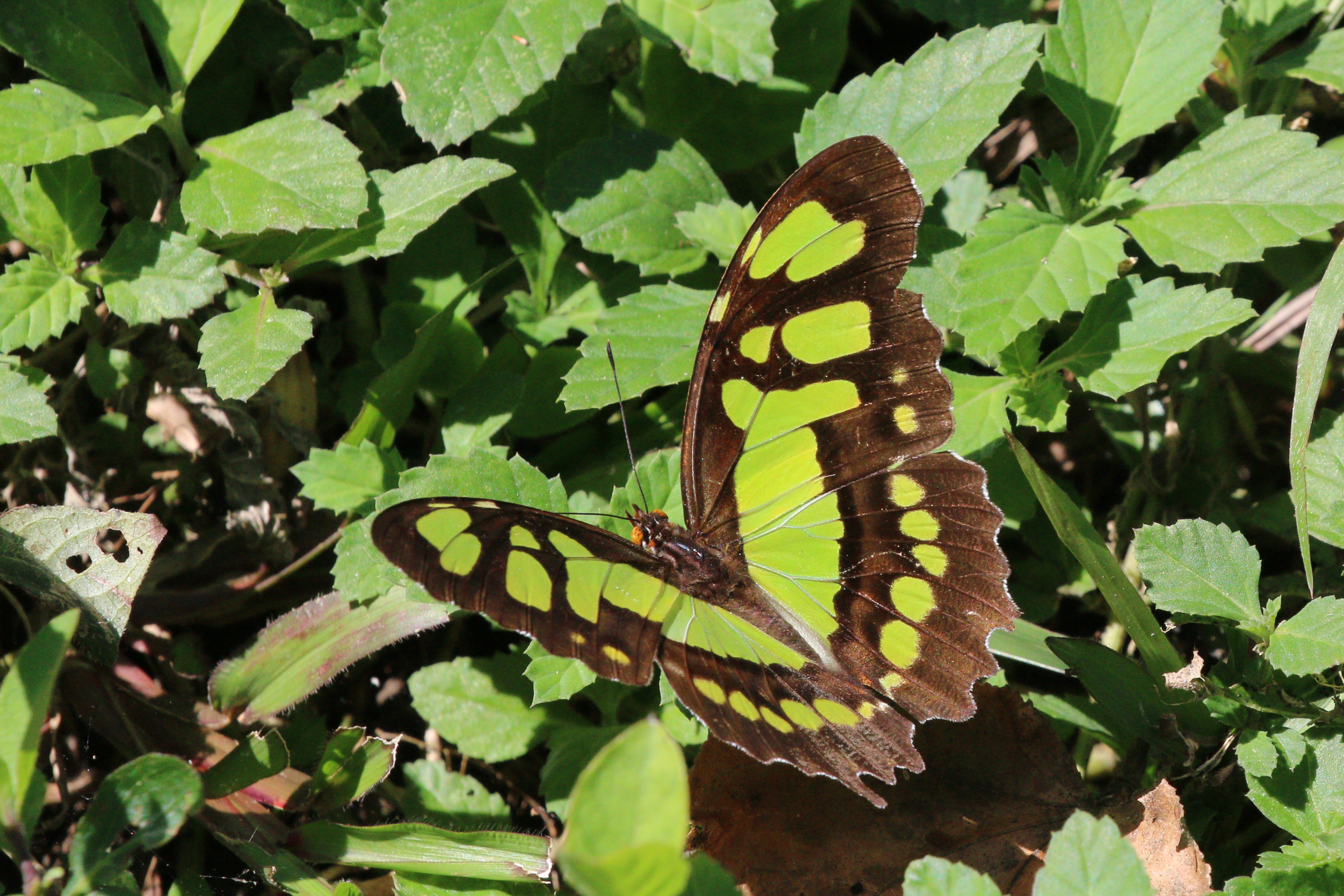
S. s. insularis, Cuba

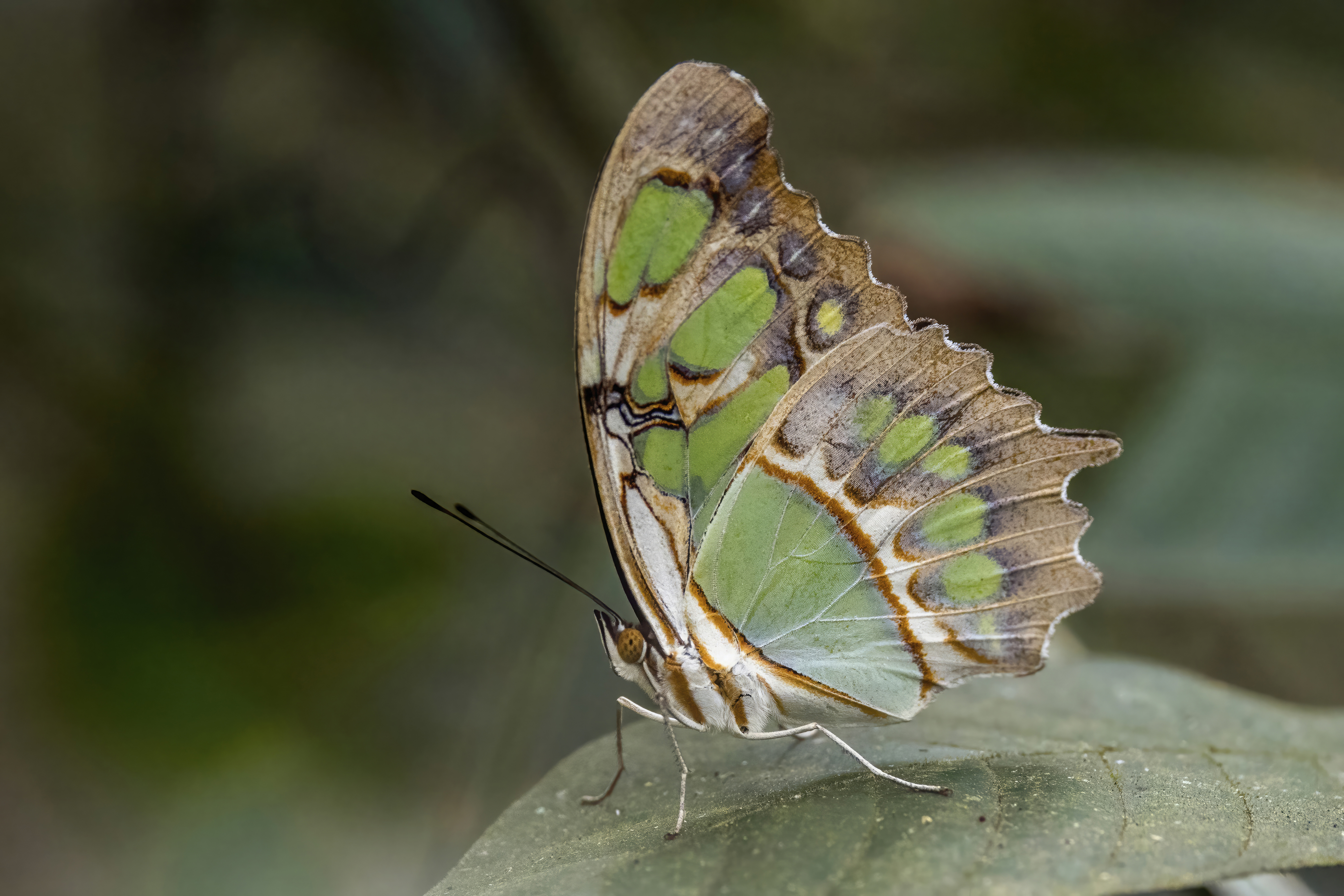
S. s. biplagiata, Honduras

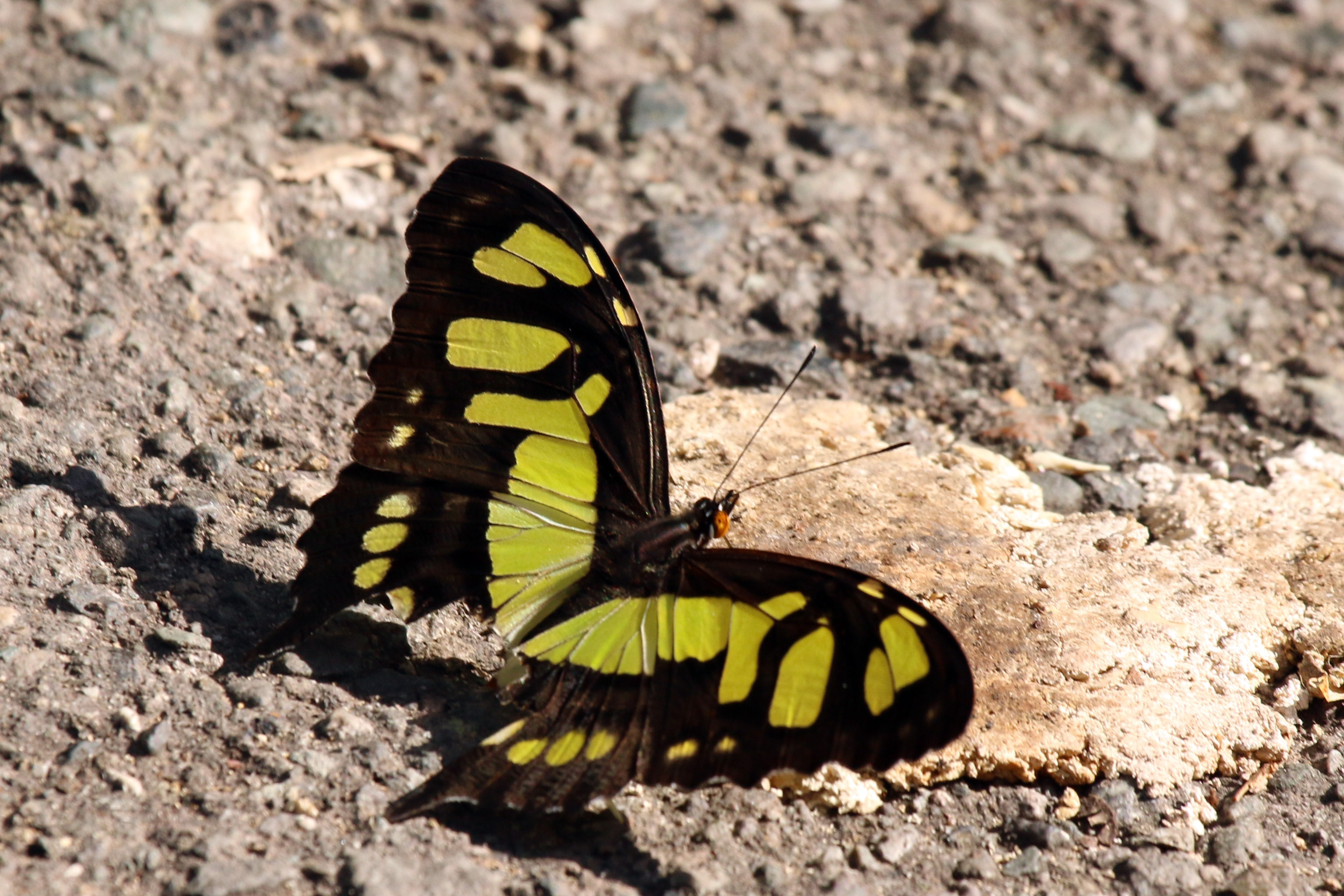
S. s. stelenes, Jamaica

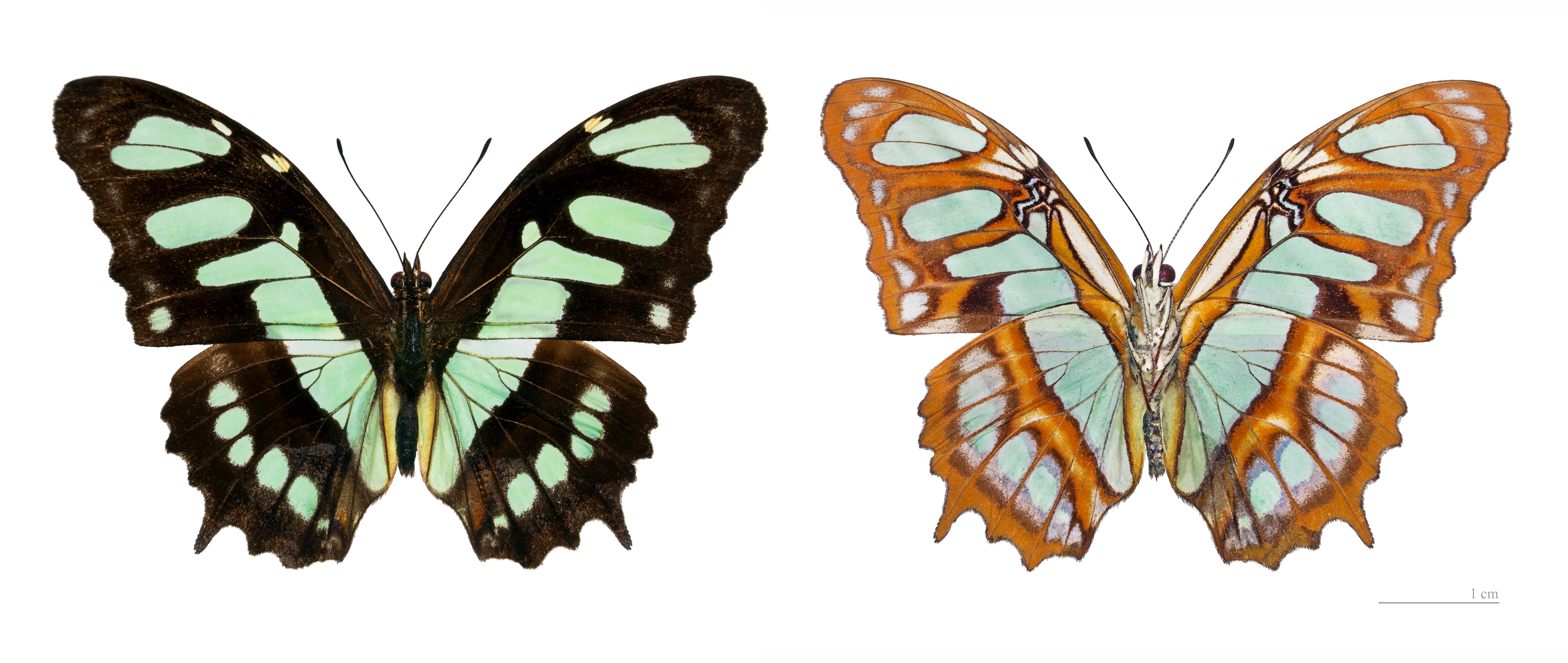
S. s. meridionalis - MHNT
