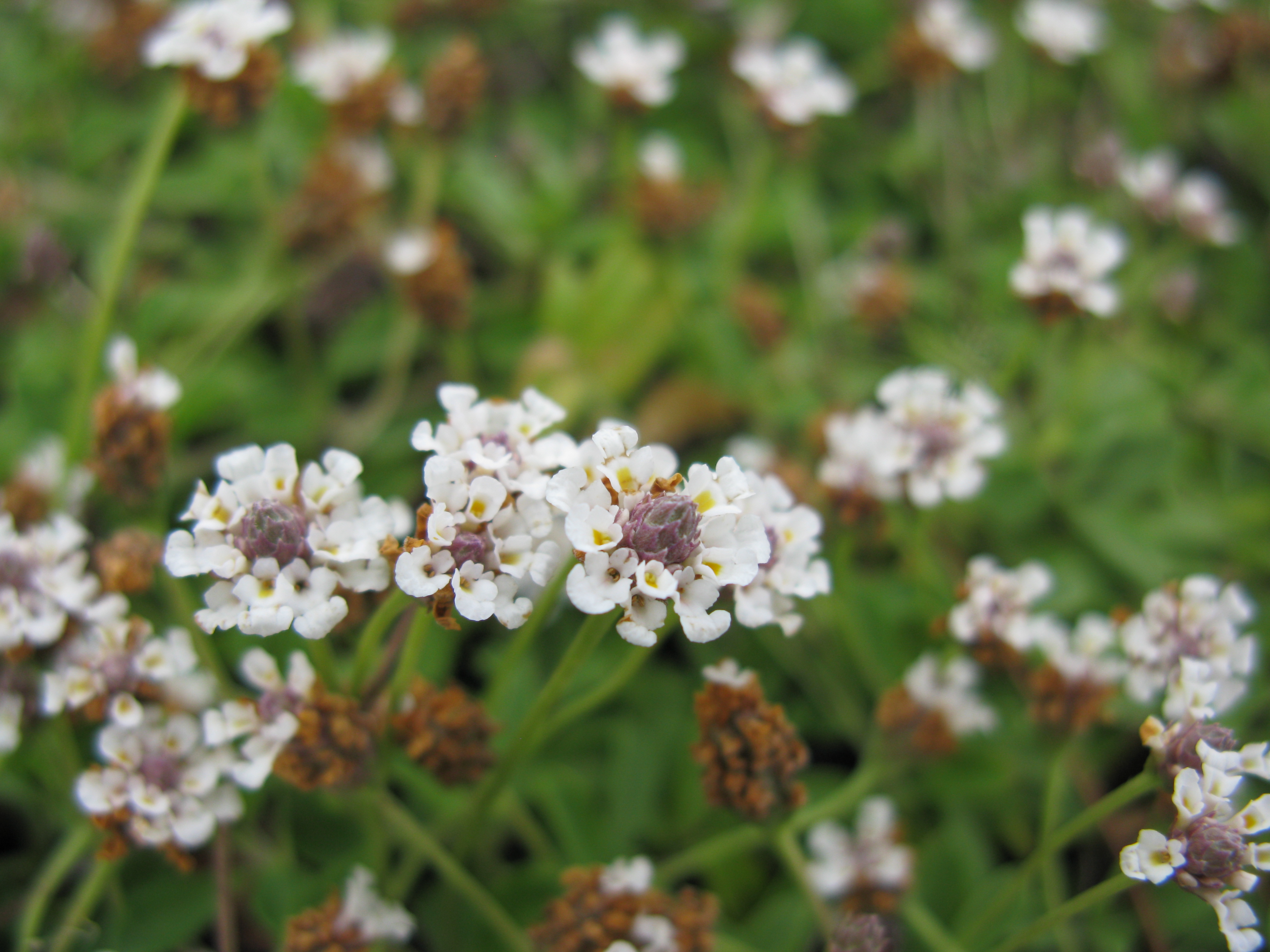

Scientific classification
- Kingdom: Plantae
- Clade: Tracheophytes
- Clade: Angiosperms
- Clade: Eudicots
- Clade: Asterids
- Order: Lamiales
- Family: Verbenaceae
- Genus: Phyla
- Species: P. canescens

Binomial name
- Phyla canescens (Kunth) Greene

Synonyms
- Lippia canescens Kunth; Lippia nodiflora (L.) Michx.; Phyla nodiflora (L.) Greene; Zapania canescens (Kunth) Gilbert; Zapania nodiflora (L.) Lam. var. rosea D. Don

= Phyla canescens =

Species of flowering plant

Phyla canescens is a species of perennial herbaceous plant in the family Verbenaceae, native to South America. It has been introduced to Australia as an ornamental plant and low-maintenance lawn, but has become naturalised and is considered a serious environmental weed. It is known by several common names including carpet weed, Condamine couch, Condamine curse, fog fruit, frog fruit, hairy fogfruit, lippia, mat grass and no-mow grass.

== Description ==
Phyla canescens is a much-branched, low, creeping perennial plant with wiry stems up to a metre long. The stems are often pinkish or brownish, producing adventitious roots at the joints and forming a tangled, dense mat. Older stems are grey and woody. The small, greyish-green and slightly fleshy leaves have short stalks and are in opposite pairs; the margins are either entire or have a few blunt teeth. The inflorescence is a dense, globular cluster of flowers, borne on a stalk in the axil of the leaves. The individual flowers have a short tube and five petal-like lobes, and are about 2.5 mm (0.1 in) long; they are white, pale pink or pale purple, with yellow centres. They are followed by small dry fruits, which remain hidden in the dried-up flower head until they split in two, when the conditions are suitable for germination.

== Distribution ==
Phyla canescens is native to South America where it has been recorded in Argentina, Bolivia, Brazil, Chile, Ecuador, Paraguay, Peru and Uruguay. It is a component of the flooding pampa grassland community. It has spread to many other parts of the world as an agricultural weed and an invasive plant. In Australia, Phyla canescens has invaded wetlands and floodplains with heavy clay soils, especially in the Murray–Darling basin, to the detriment of the native vegetation; the plant does best in habitats that are inundated occasionally, but can not compete with the grass Paspalum distichum and the sedge Eleocharis plana in more heavily inundated sites.

== Ecology ==
Phyla canescens is capable of setting seed by self-pollination but has no particular adaptations for this. In Australia, it has been found that the flowers are usually pollinated by the honey bee (Apis mellifera), an introduced species, a non-native species like the plant itself. In the absence of honey bees, little seed is set.

In Argentina, Phyla canescens has been found to be dominant in areas around plains viscacha (Lagostomus maximus) colonies; this seems to be because the plant's low growth habit and its lack of palatability to the viscachas, which selectively feed on grasses, allows the Phyla canescens to proliferate uncontrolled. The plant also flourishes in areas with high livestock grazing pressure.
