= Boston Journal of Natural History =

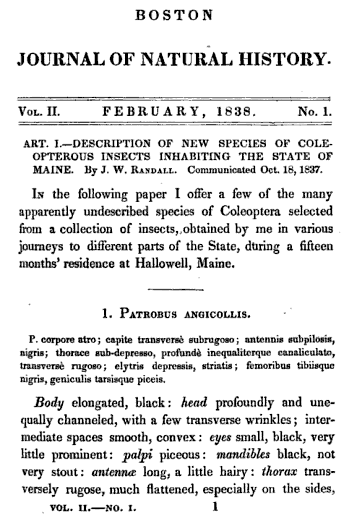

The Boston Journal of Natural History (1834–1863) was a scholarly journal published by the Boston Society of Natural History in mid-19th century Massachusetts. Contributors included Charles T. Jackson, Augustus A. Gould, and others. Each volume featured lithographic illustrations, some in color, drawn/engraved by E.W. Bouvé, B.F. Nutting, A. Sonrel, et al. and printed by Pendleton's Lithography and other firms.

The journal was continued by Memoirs Read Before the Boston Society of Natural History in 1863.

== Image gallery ==
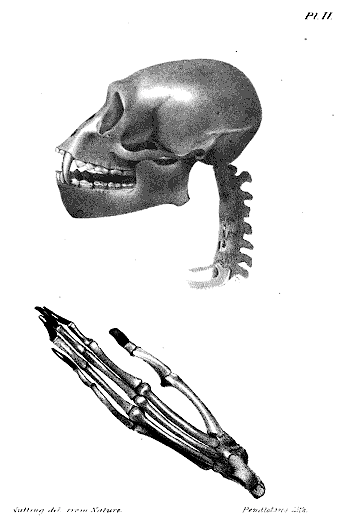
Plate from v.1, 1837

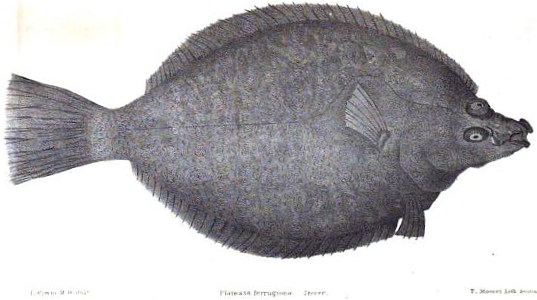
Plate from v.2, 1839

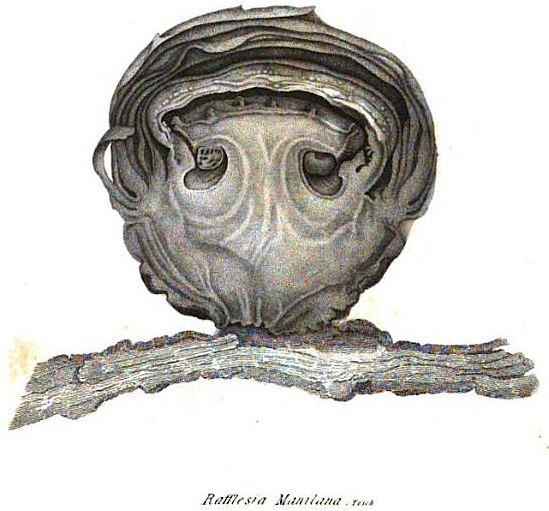
Plate from v.4, 1844

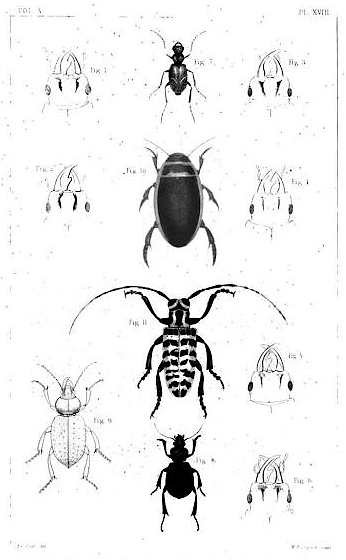
Plate from v.5, 1847
