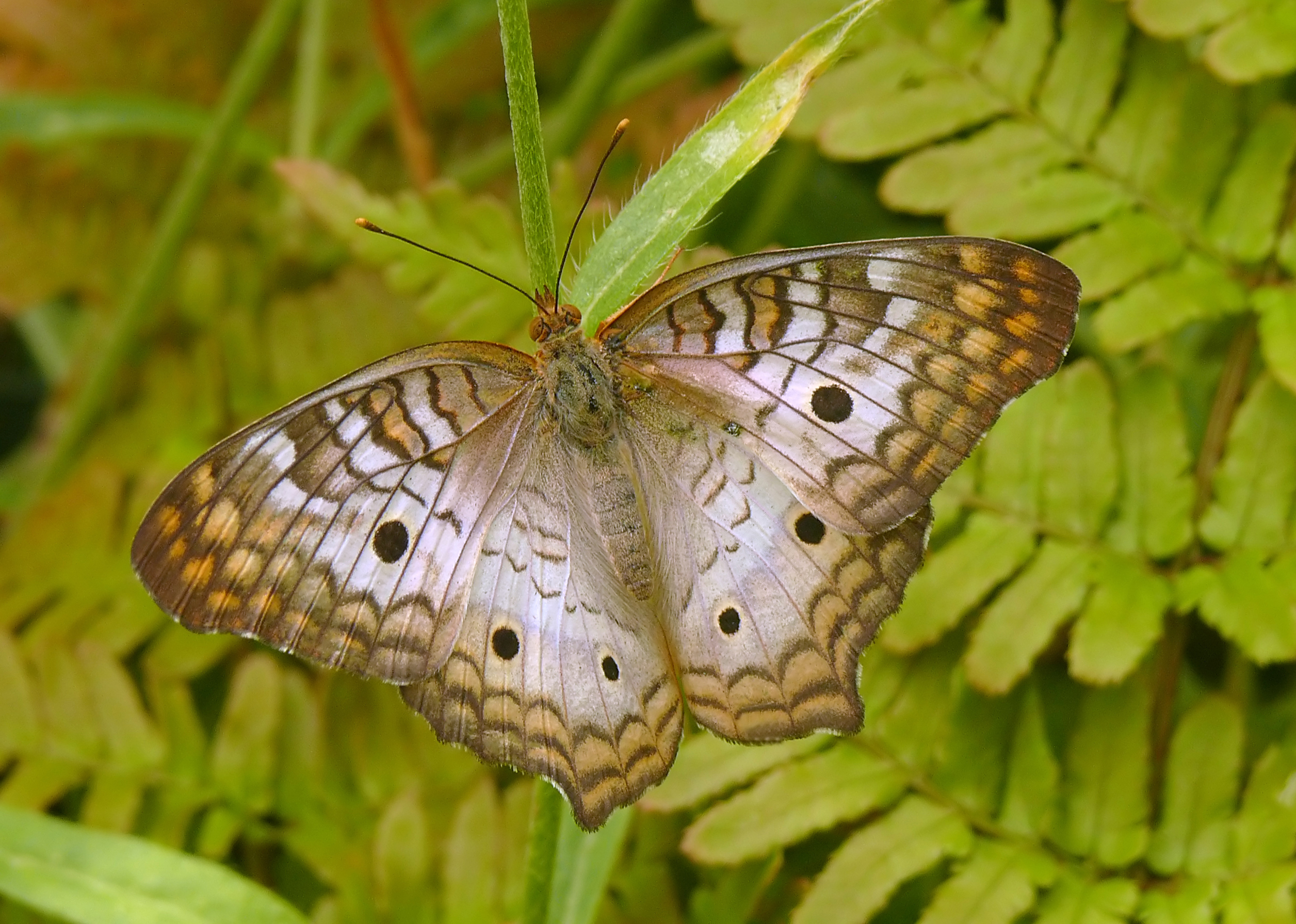
- Butterfly house specimen
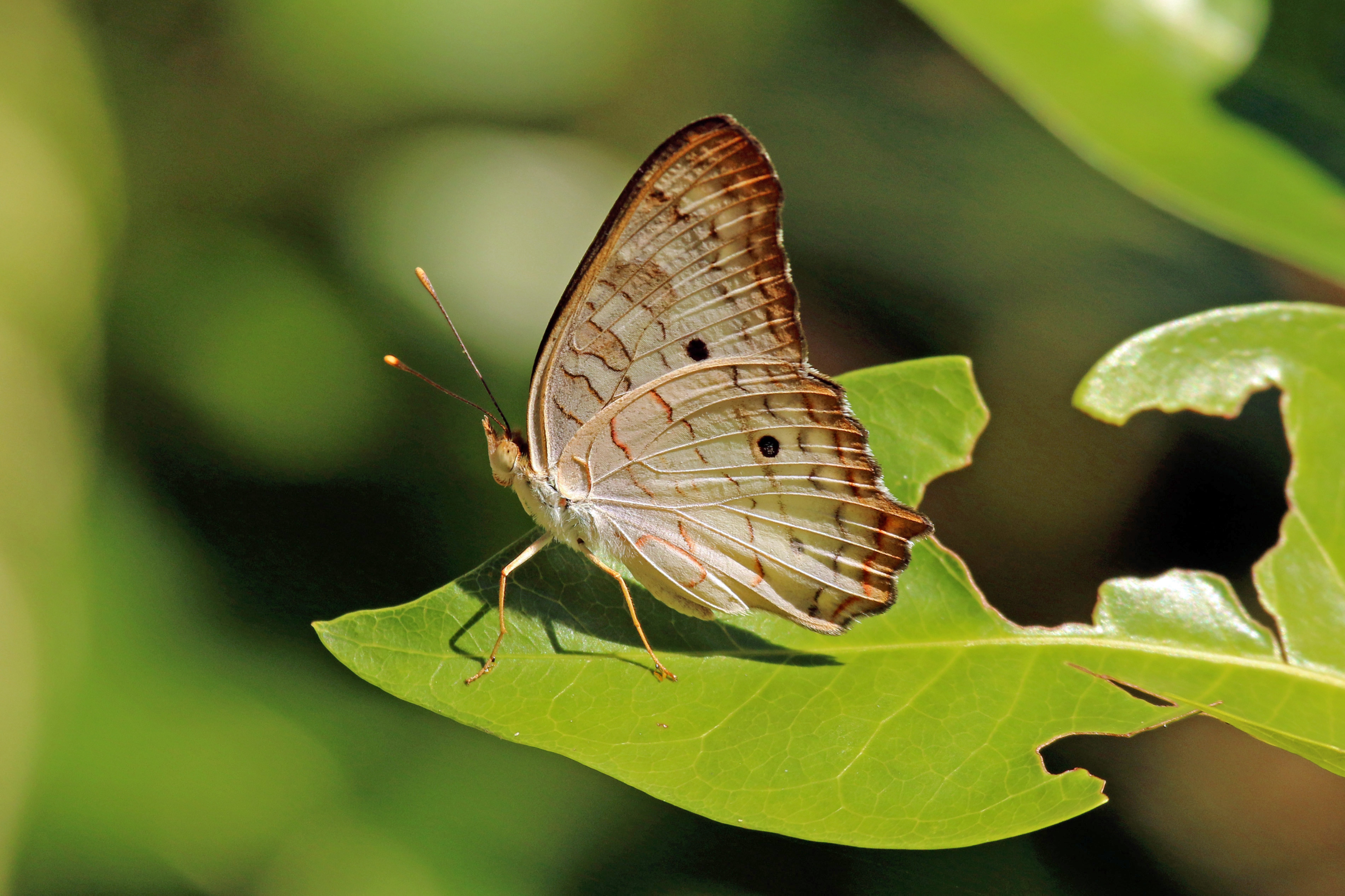
- A. j. jatrophae, Tobago

Conservation status
- Secure (NatureServe)

Scientific classification
- Kingdom: Animalia
- Phylum: Arthropoda
- Clade: Pancrustacea
- Class: Insecta
- Order: Lepidoptera
- Family: Nymphalidae
- Genus: Anartia
- Species: A. jatrophae

Binomial name
- Anartia jatrophae (Linnaeus, 1763)

= Anartia jatrophae =

Species of butterfly

Anartia jatrophae, the white peacock, is a species of butterfly found in the southeastern United States, Central America, and throughout much of South America. The white peacock's larval hosts are water hyssop (Bacopa monnieri), lemon bacopa (Bacopa caroliniensis), tropical waterhyssop (Bacopa innominata), frogfruit (Phyla nodiflora), lanceleaf frogfruit (Phyla lanceolata), and Carolina wild petunia (Ruellia caroliniana). The males of the species display a unique territorial behavior, in which they stake out a territory typically 15 meters in diameter that contains larval host plants. They perch in this area and aggressively protect it from other insects and other male white peacocks.

== Subspecies ==
Seven subspecies are recognized.

- A. j. guantanamo – Florida and Cuba
- A. j. intermedia – Saint Croix
- A. j. jamaicensis – Jamaica
- A. j. jatrophae – South America from Venezuela to Argentina
- A. j. luteipicta – Central America from Mexico to Colombia
- A. j. saturata – Brazil
- A. j. semifusca – Puerto Rico
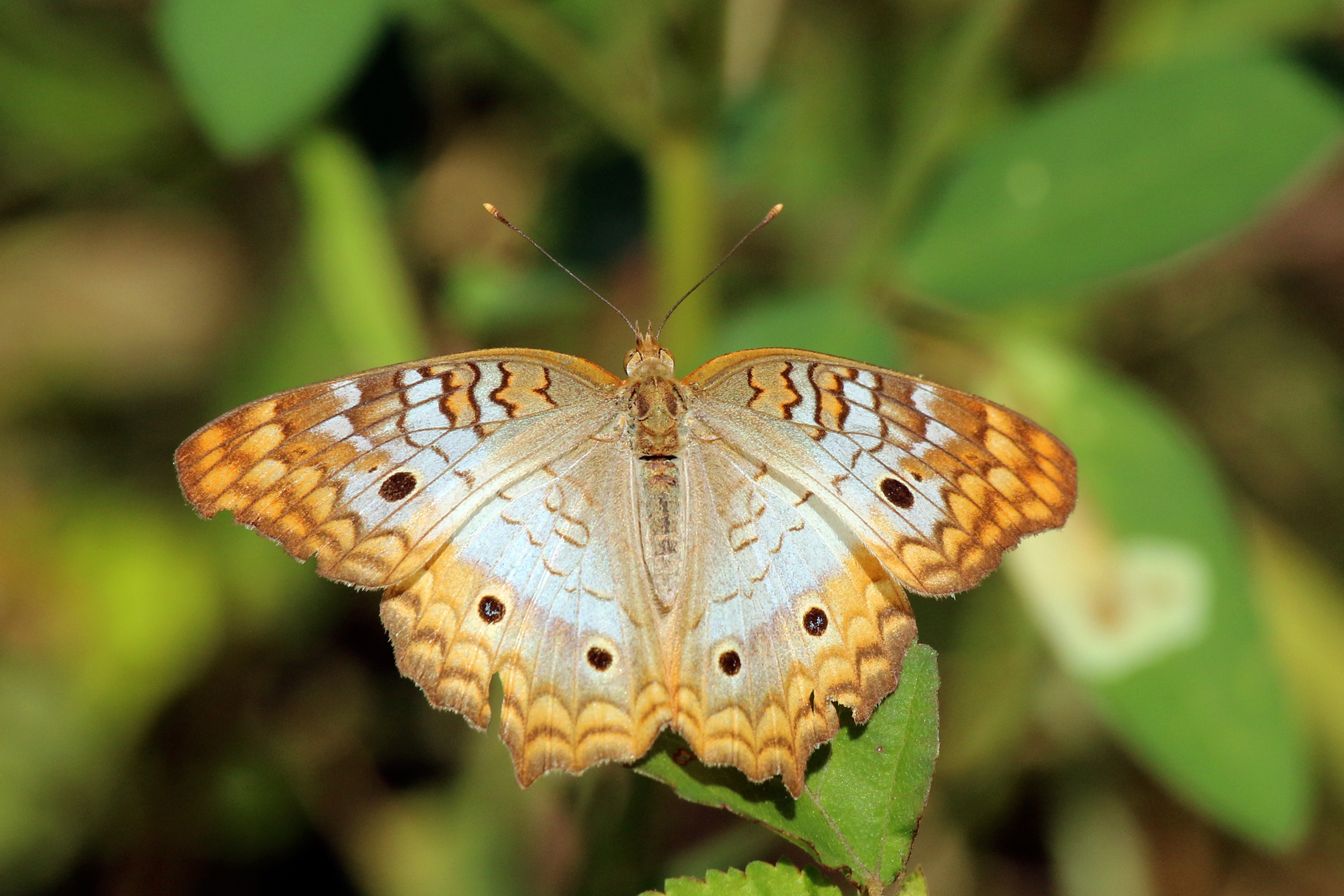
A. j. jamaicensis, Jamaica

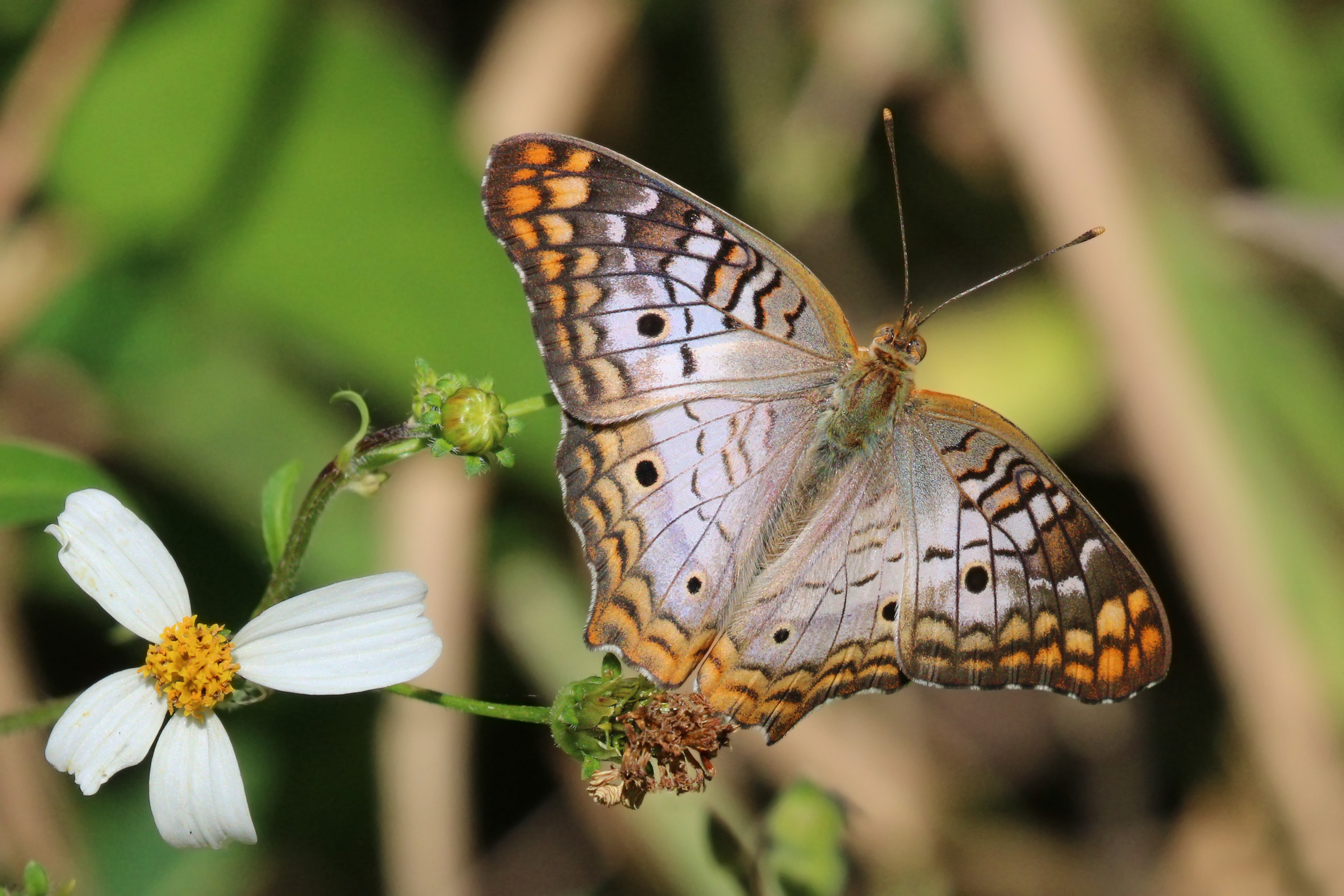
A. j. guantanamo topside, Cuba

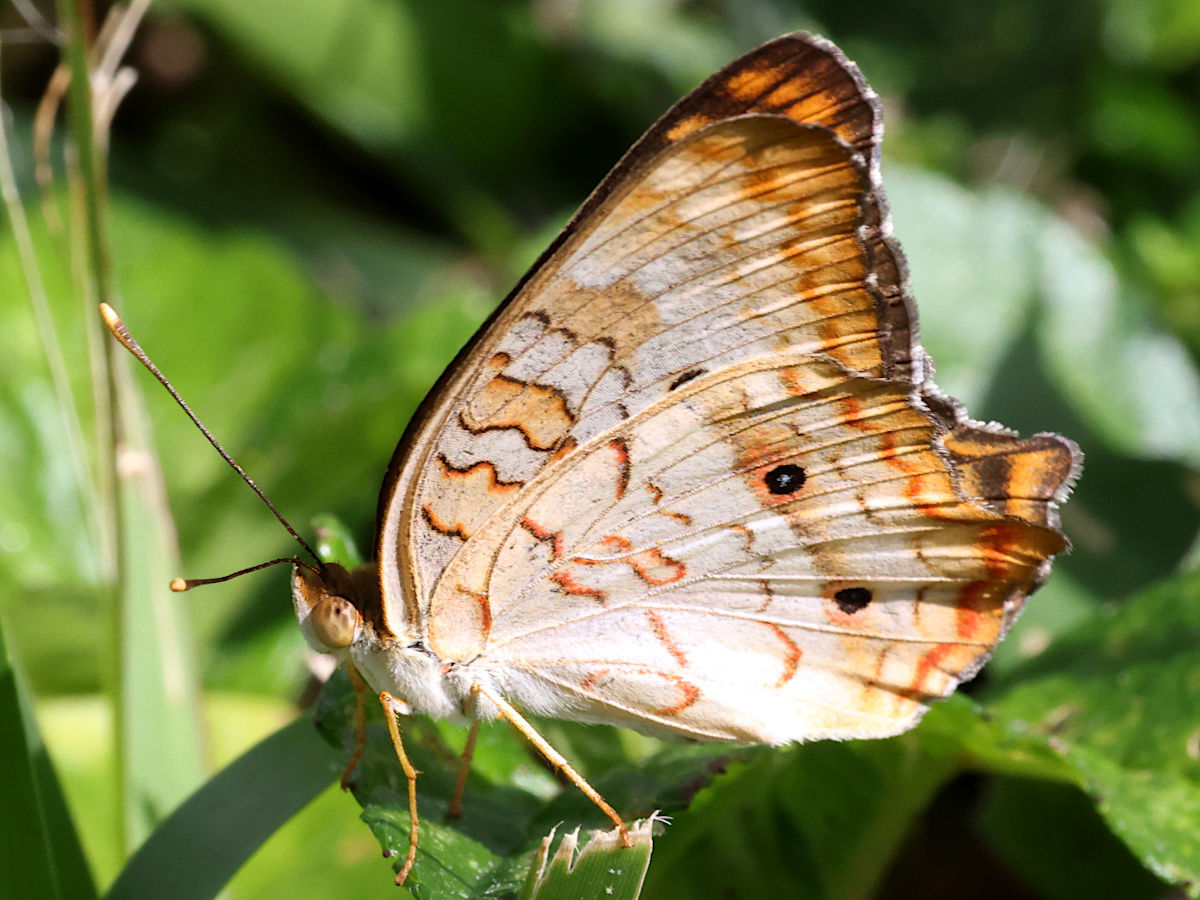
A. j. guantanamo underside, Florida

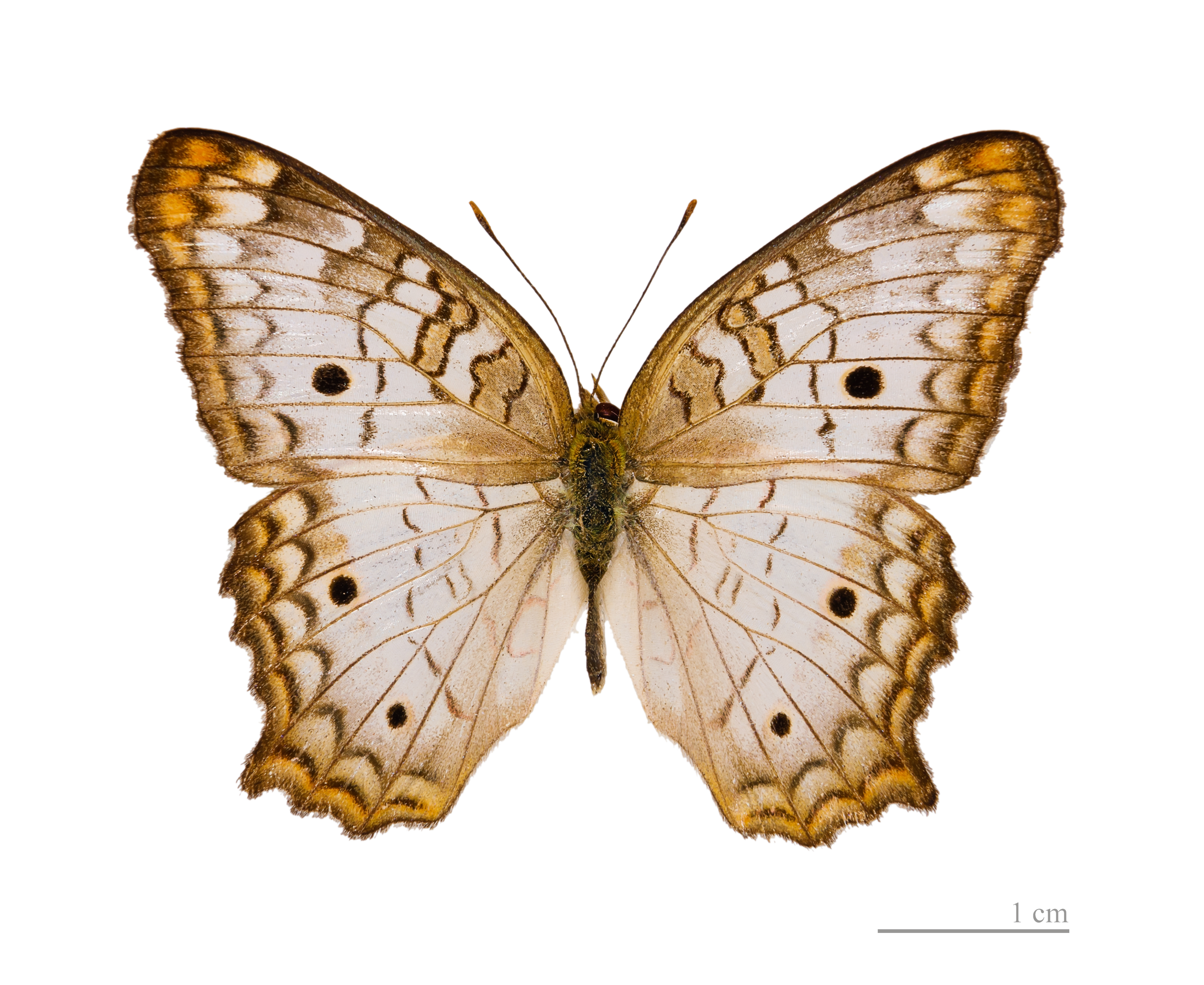
Topside, male MHNT

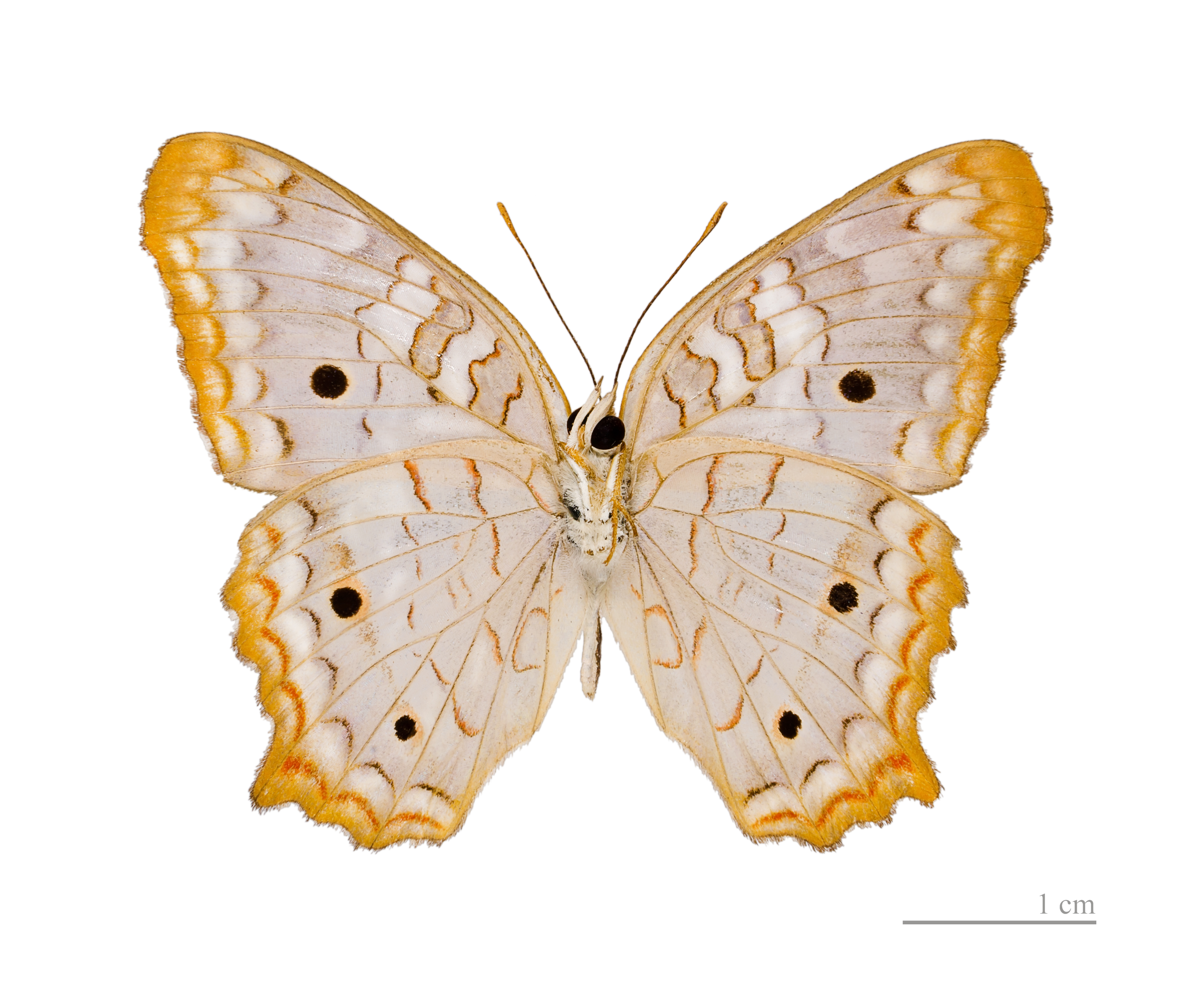
Underside, male MHNT

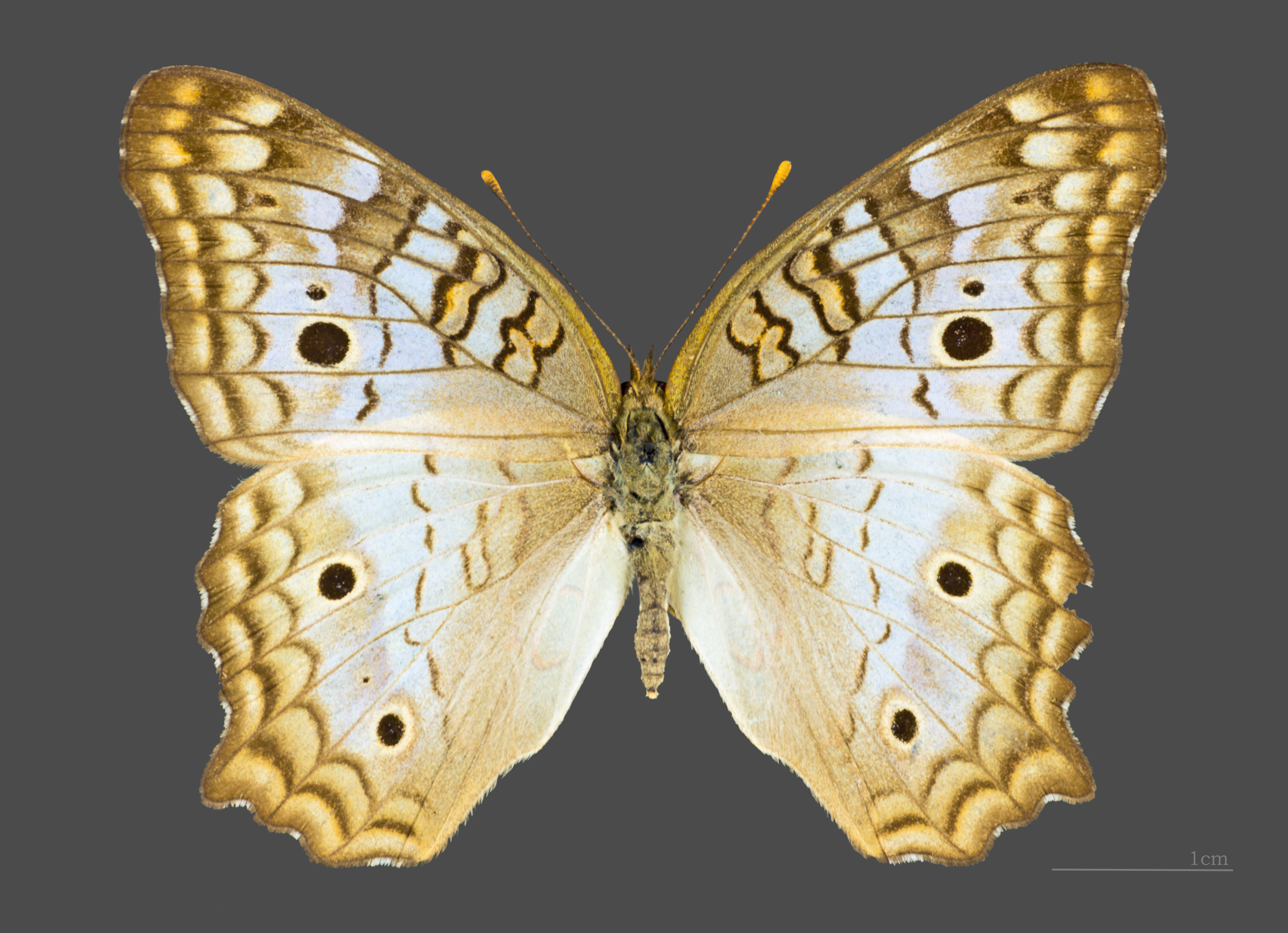
Topside, female MHNT

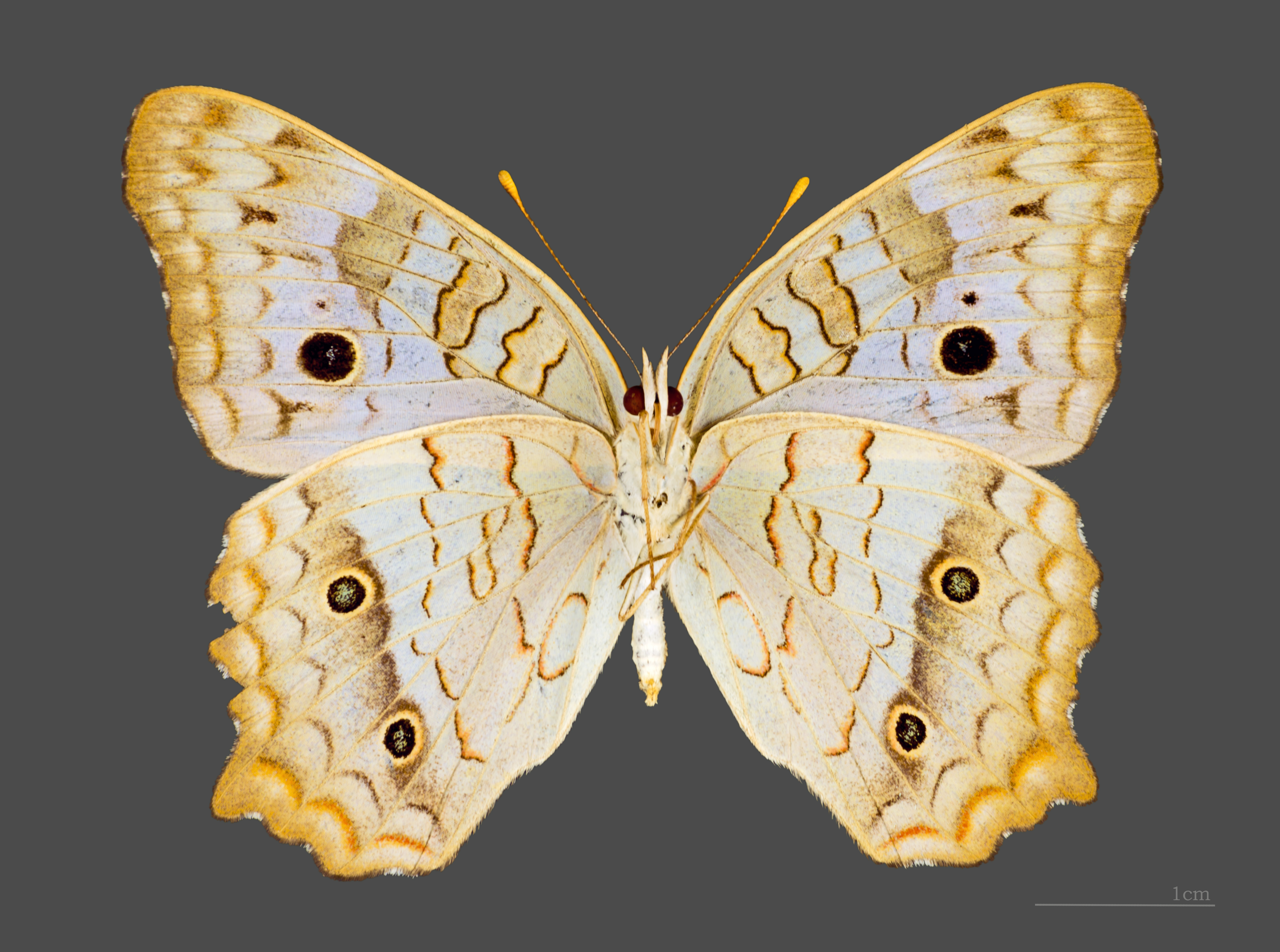
Underside, female MHNT
