= Boston Society of Natural History =

American natural history society

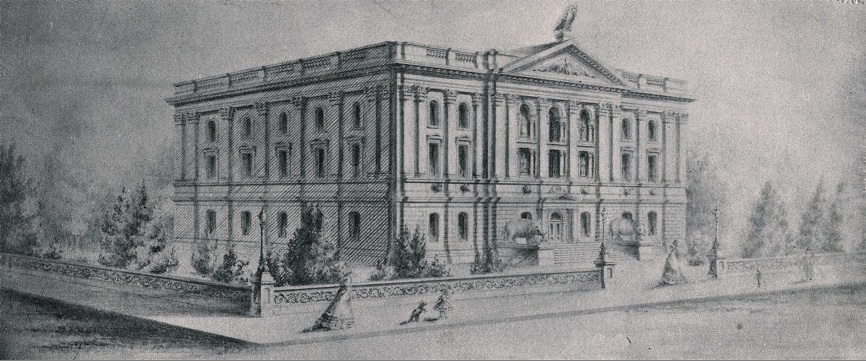
New England Museum of Natural History, corner of Boylston and Berkeley Streets, Back Bay, Boston, 19th century

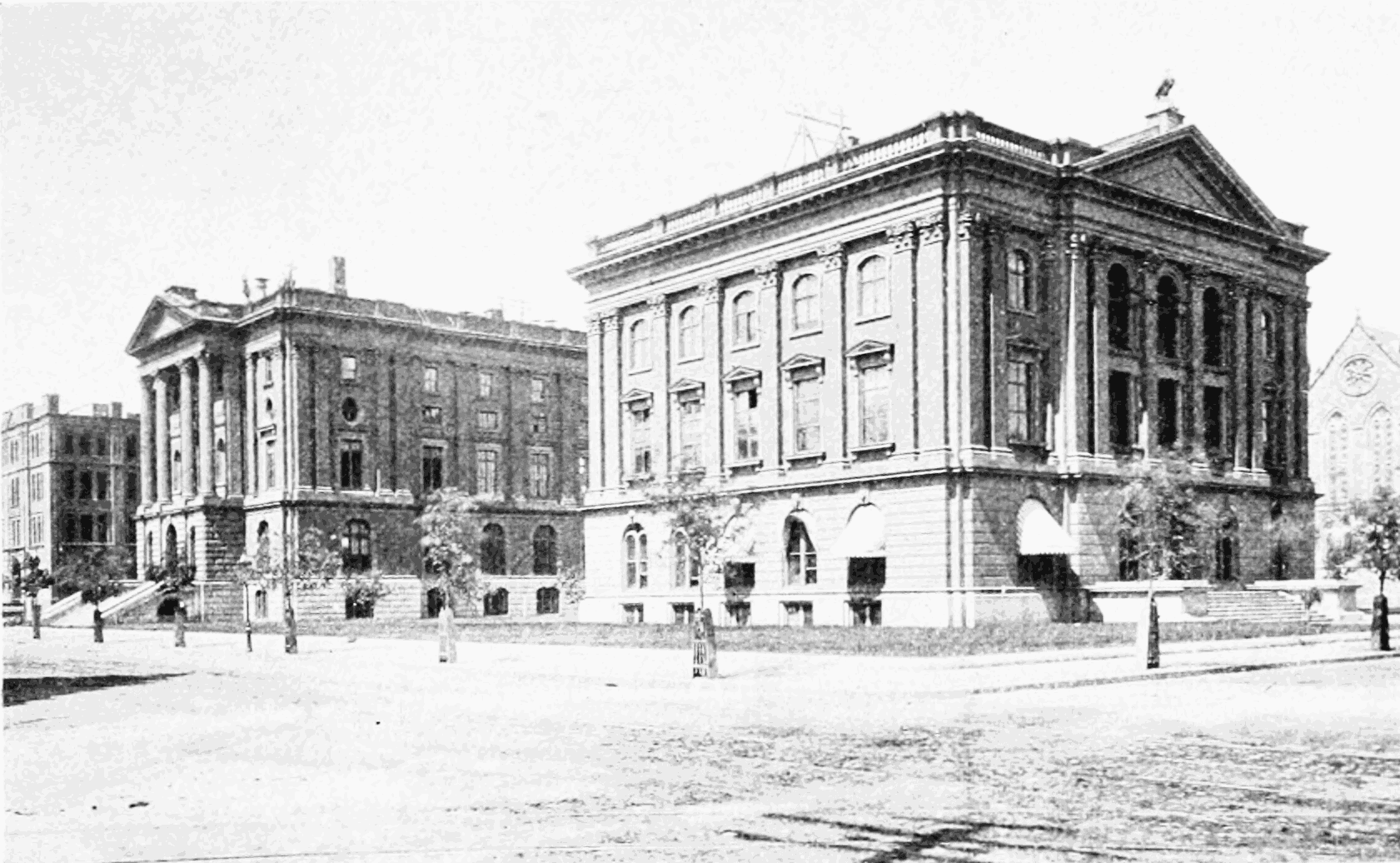
Boston Society of Natural History and Rogers Building, Photographie

The Boston Society of Natural History (1830–1948) in Boston, Massachusetts, was an organization dedicated to the study and promotion of natural history. It published a scholarly journal and established a museum. In its first few decades, the society occupied several successive locations in Boston's Financial District, including Pearl Street, Tremont Street and Mason Street. In 1864 it moved into a newly constructed museum building at 234 Berkeley Street in the Back Bay, designed by architect William Gibbons Preston. In 1951 the society evolved into the Museum of Science, and relocated to its current site on the Charles River.

== History ==
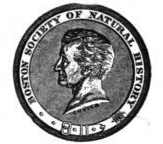
Emblem of the BSNH, adopted in 1842. Depicts Georges Cuvier

Founders of the society in 1830 included Amos Binney Jr., Edward Brooks, Walter Channing, Henry Codman, George B. Emerson, Joshua B. Flint, Benjamin D. Greene, Simon E. Greene, William Grigg, George Hayward, David Humphreys Storer, and John Ware. Several had previously been involved with the Linnaean Society of New England. By 1838, the society held "regular meetings on the 2nd and 4th Wednesday of each month." "In its collection are about 700 specimens in mineralogy and geology, besides the rich collection of Dr. C.T. Jackson, and the state collection; botany, 5,000; mammalia, 30 entire skeletons and 30 crania; birds, 200 species; reptiles, 130; insects, about 15,000; crustacea, 130; radiata, 190. Library, 600 volumes and pamphlets. The room ... gratuitously opened to the public every Wednesday from 12 to 2 o'clock."

== Walker Prize ==
In 1864, William Johnson Walker, a surgeon and financial supporter of the society, donated money for the Walker Prize to recognize work in the field of natural history. In the 1960s its scope was extended to all areas of science and with an emphasis on communication as well as excellence. One of the recipients, while he was a first year student at the Lawrence Scientific School (which later became part of Harvard University) was the zoologist William Patten. The ornithologist and evolutionary biologist V. C. Wynne-Edwards received the award twice, for his fieldwork on populations of marine birds.

The many scholars and curators affiliated with the society at various times included Alexander Emanuel Agassiz, Thomas Tracy Bouvé, Thomas Mayo Brewer, Augustus Addison Gould, F. W. P. Greenwood, Charles Thomas Jackson, Charles Sedgwick Minot, Albert Ordway, Samuel Hubbard Scudder, Charles J. Sprague, Alpheus Hyatt, and Jeffries Wyman.

"After World War II, under the leadership of Bradford Washburn, the society sold the Berkeley Street building, changed its name to the Boston Museum of Science. ... The cornerstone for the new Museum was laid at Science Park [in 1949] and a temporary building was erected to house the Museum's collections and staff. In 1951, the first wing of the new Museum officially opened."

== Galleries ==
=== 1830–1833 ===
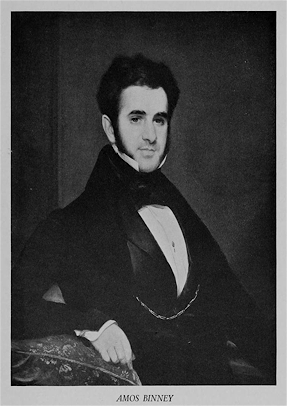
Amos Binney, founder

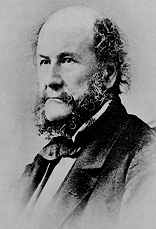
George B. Emerson, founder

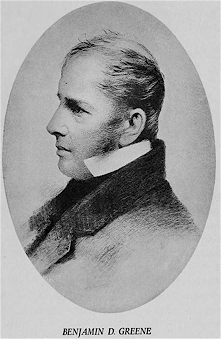
Benjamin D. Greene, founder

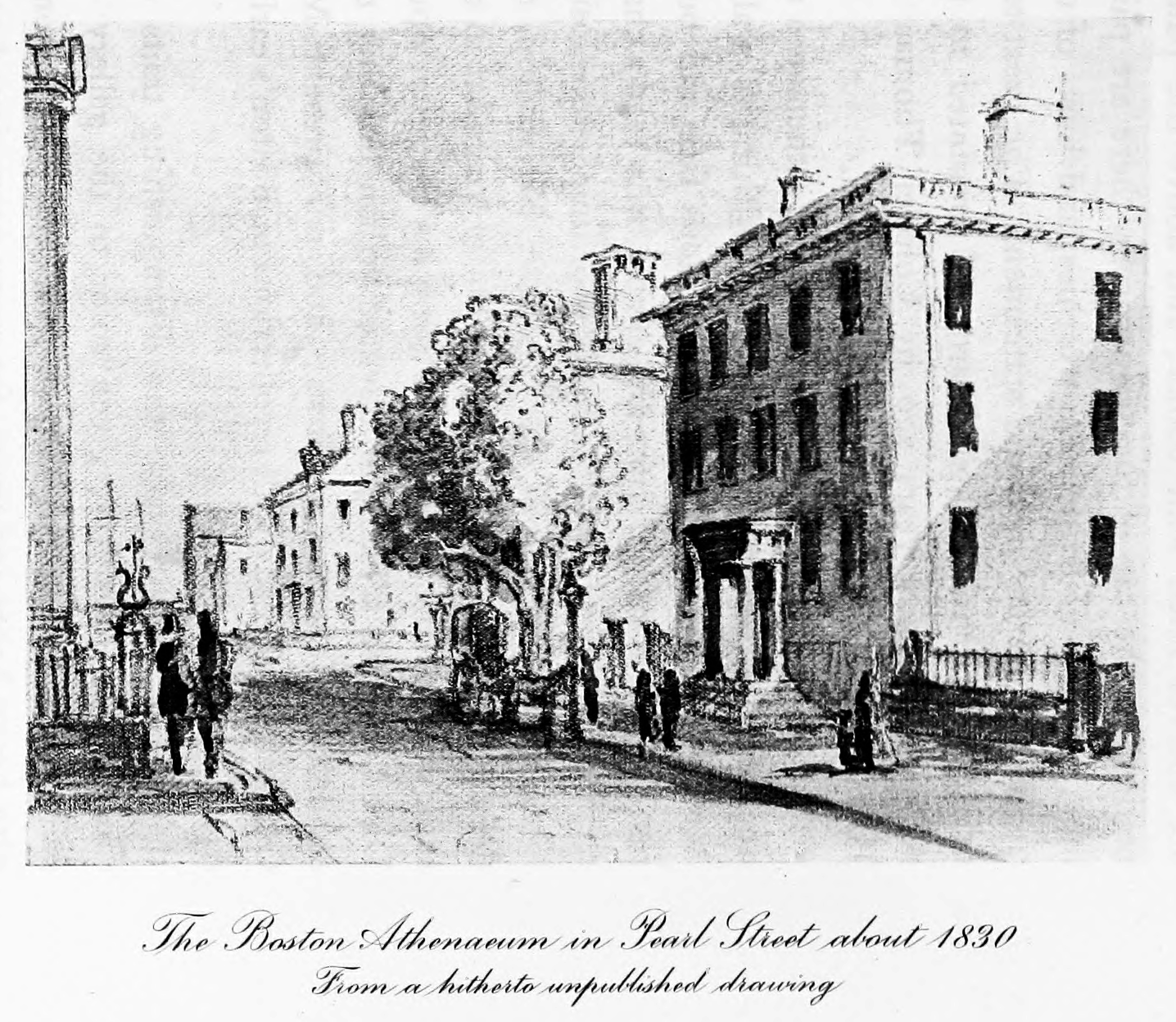
Boston Athenaeum building, Pearl Street, Boston, home to the BSNH in the early 1830s

=== 1833–1863 ===
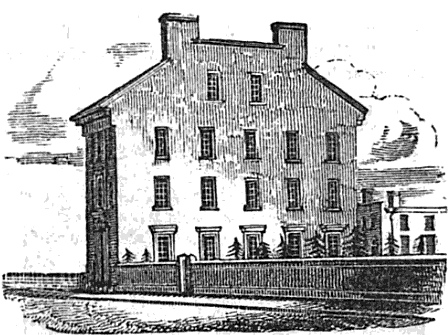
Building of the Provident Inst. for Savings, Tremont St., Boston, built in 1833. Offices on the third floor were occupied by the Boston Society of Natural History, 1833–1847.

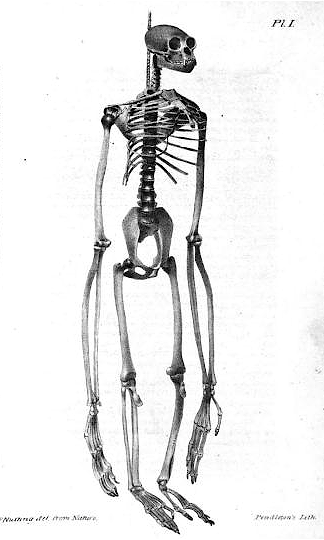
Plate from: Boston Journal of Natural History, 1837

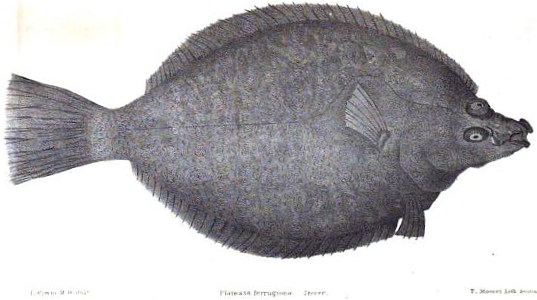
Plate from: Boston Journal of Natural History, v.2. 1839.

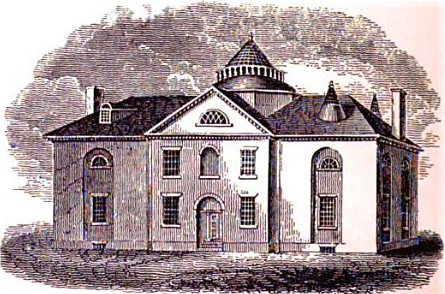
Home of the Boston Society of Natural History (c. 1847–1863), Mason Street, Boston

=== 1864–1946 ===
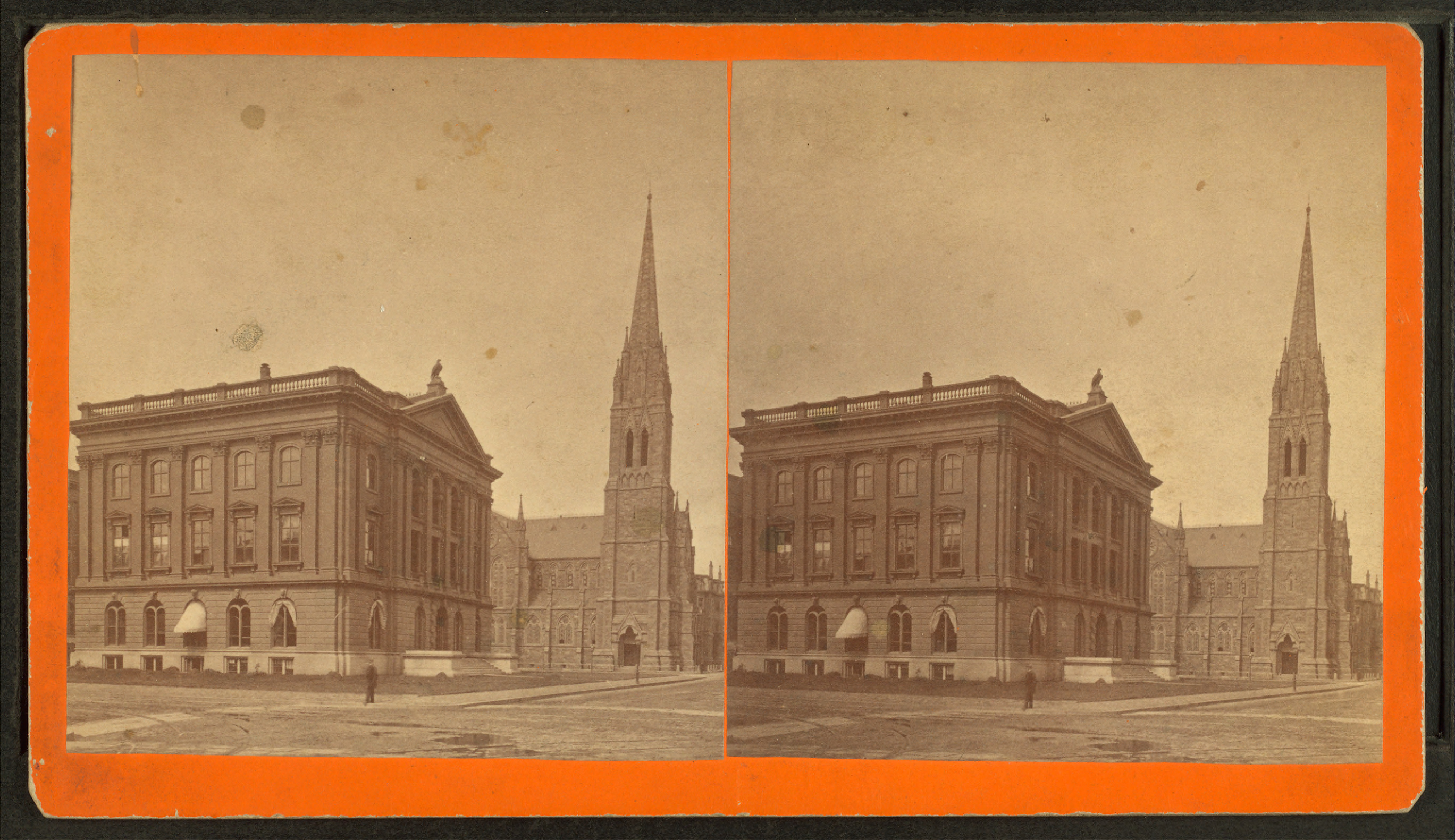
Natural History Museum, corner of Boylston Street and Berkeley Street, Back Bay, Boston, c. 1864

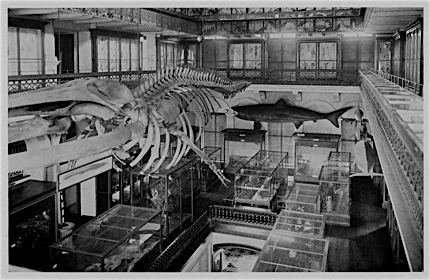
Museum exhibition gallery, c. 1930

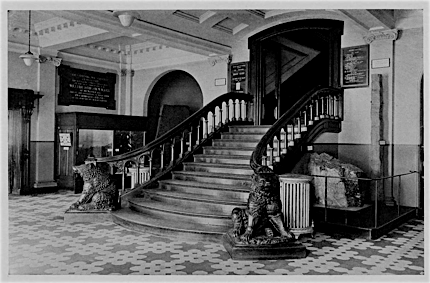
Museum interior, c. 1930

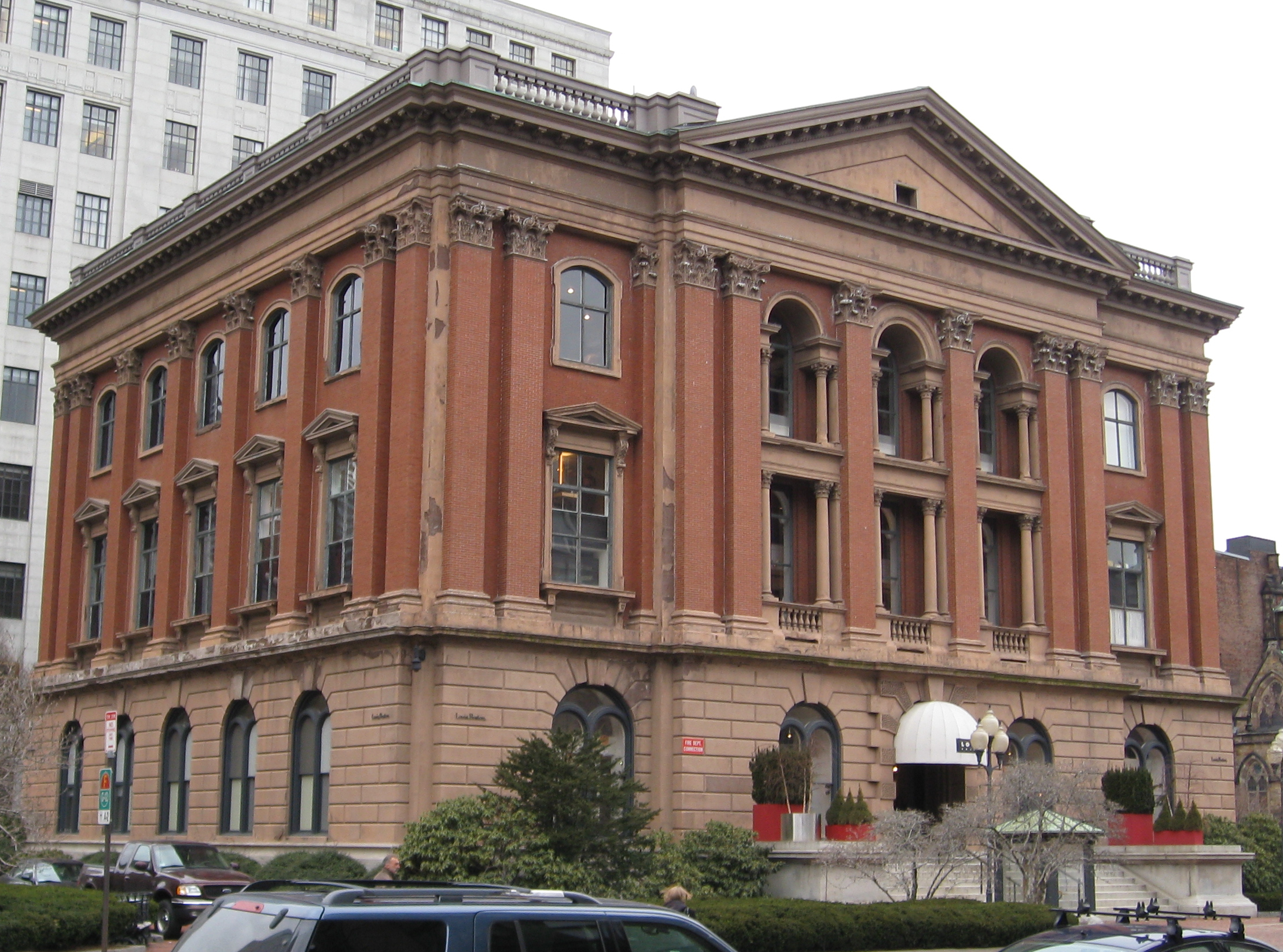
Former museum building, 234 Berkeley Street, Boston, 2009

== See also ==
- Boston Journal of Natural History, published by the society (1834–1863)
- Museum of Science (Boston)
