= Greenea =

Scientific classification
- Kingdom: Plantae
- Clade: Tracheophytes
- Clade: Angiosperms
- Clade: Eudicots
- Clade: Asterids
- Order: Gentianales
- Family: Rubiaceae
- Subfamily: Ixoroideae
- Tribe: Greeneeae
- Genus: Greenea; Wight & Arn.

Type species
- Greenea wightiana (syn. of Greenea corymbosa var. corymbosa) Wight & Arn.

Synonyms
- Rhombospora Korth.; Spathichlamys R.Parker

Genus of plants

Greenea is a genus of flowering plants in the family Rubiaceae. The genus is found from Indo-China to Sumatra. It is named in honor of Benjamin D. Greene.

== Species ==
- Greenea adangensis Tange
- Greenea commersonii (Korth.) Tange ex Ruhsam
- Greenea corymbosa (Jack) Voigt
- Greenea montana Tange
- Greenea parkinsonii C.E.C.Fisch.
- Greenea rivularis Tange
- Greenea schizocorolla Tange
- Greenea secunda (Griff.) Craib
- Greenea vietnamensis Tange
