= Henry Cheever Pratt =

American painter and explorer (1803–1880)

Henry Cheever Pratt (1803–1880) was an American artist and explorer. He lived in Boston, Massachusetts.

== Biography ==
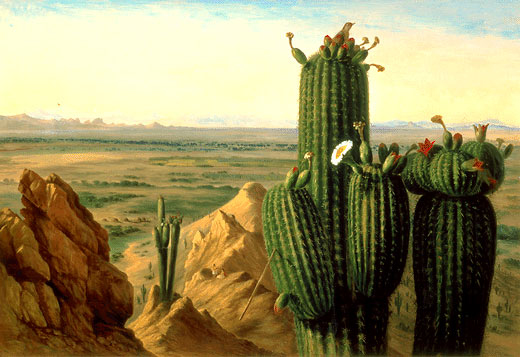
View from Maricopa Mountain near the Rio Gila, 1855

Born in Orford, New Hampshire, and trained by Samuel F. B. Morse, Pratt painted landscapes of Maine on painting trips with Thomas Cole and of the American Southwest while on boundary surveying expeditions. John Russell Bartlett's A Personal Narrative of Explorations and Incidents in Texas, New Mexico, California, Sonora and Chihuahua (2 vols., 1854) contains 30 of Pratt's illustrations.

Pratt's paintings include View of Smith's West Texas Ranch (1852) now owned by the Texas Memorial Museum at the University of Texas at Austin. Other paintings are in the collections of Brown University and the Amon Carter Museum in Fort Worth, Texas.

Pratt also painted portraits. Through his career, portrait subjects included:

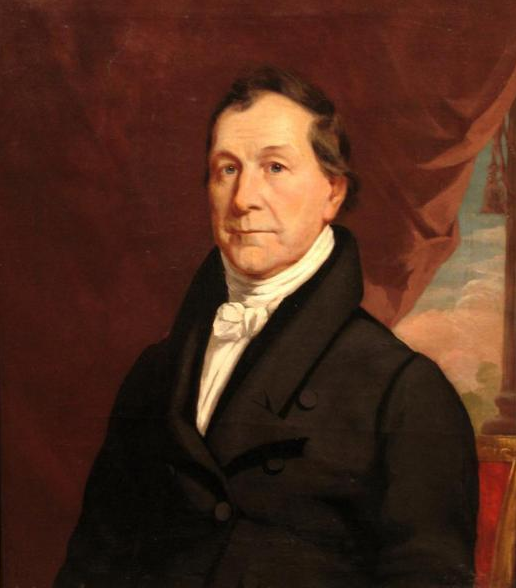
Isaac Ilsley, 1826

- Josefa Anchondo
- John Russell Bartlett (1852)
- Henry Gardner Bridges
- Adeline Burr Ellery
- Nicholas Emery
- Isaac Ilsley
- Adoniram Judson
- Marquis de Lafayette
- James Wiley Magoffin (1852)
- Benjamin Pierce
- Martha C. Dickinson Pooke
- Elizabeth Trull (1831), possibly one of the granddaughters of Capt. John Trull
- William Johnson Walker
- Russell Warren
- John B. Wheeler

== Gallery ==
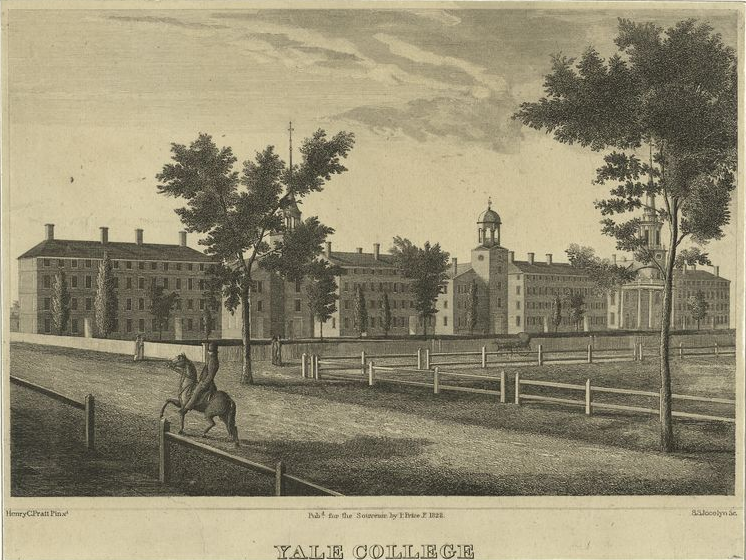
Yale College, 1828. Drawn by Pratt, engraved by S.S. Jocelyn

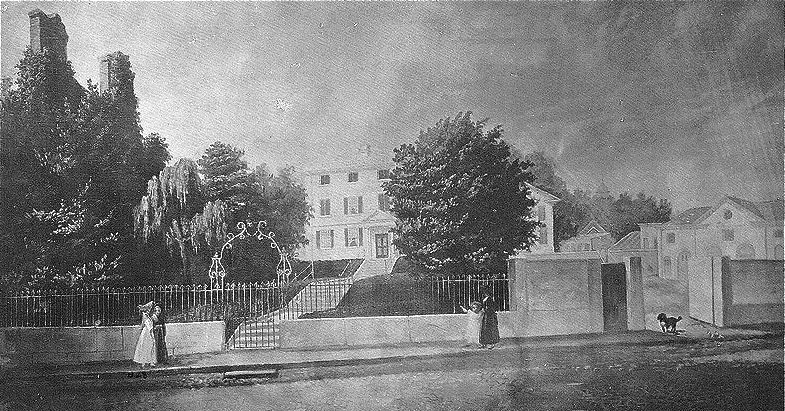
House of Gardiner Greene, Pemberton Hill, Boston, 1843

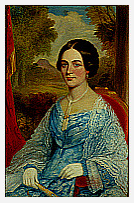
Josefa Anchondo, 1852

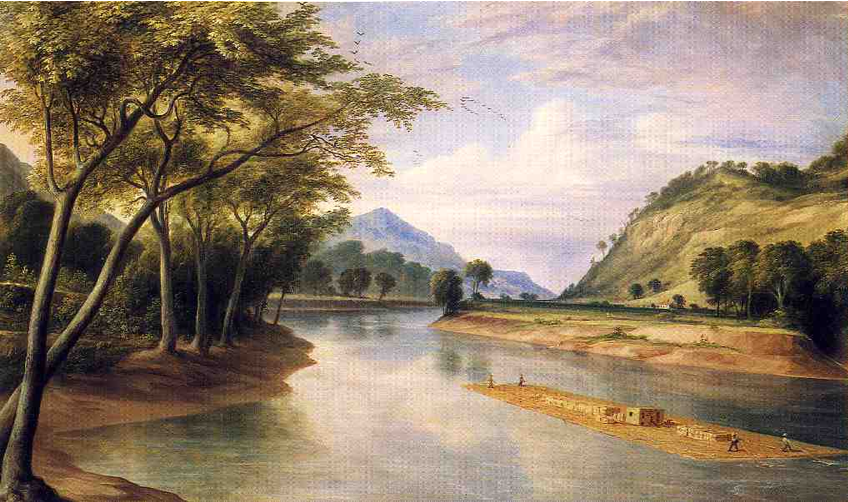
Ohio River Near Marietta, 1855

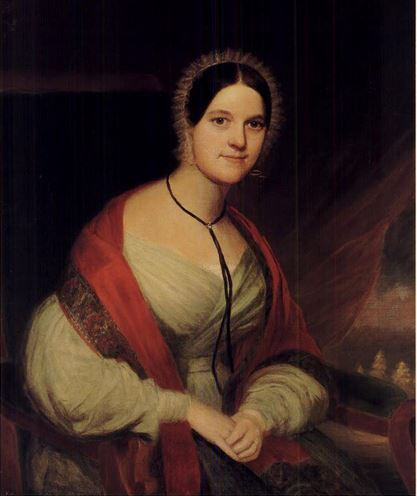
Adeline Burr Ellery
