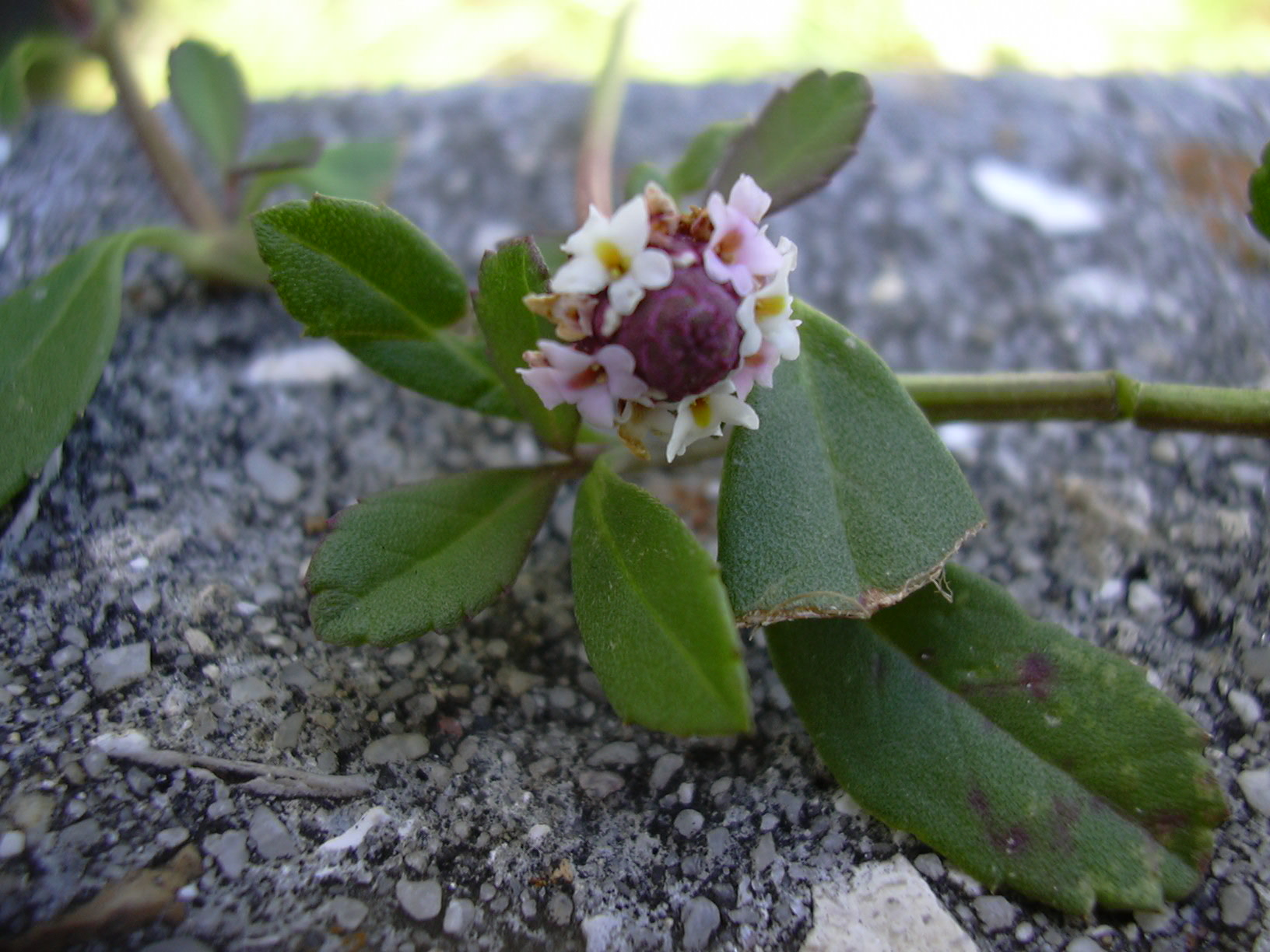
- Turkey tangle (P. nodiflora) with inflorescence

Scientific classification
- Kingdom: Plantae
- Clade: Tracheophytes
- Clade: Angiosperms
- Clade: Eudicots
- Clade: Asterids
- Order: Lamiales
- Family: Verbenaceae
- Genus: Phyla; Lour.

Type species
- Phyla chinensis Lour.

Species
- See text

Synonyms
- Cryptocalyx Benth.; Diototheca Raf.; Panope Raf.; Piarimula Raf.; Platonia Raf.

= Phyla (genus) =

Fogfruits or frogfruits

Genus of plants in the verbena family

Phyla /ˈfaɪlə/ is a genus of eustarid plants in the verbena family, Verbenaceae. The name is derived from the Greek word φυλή (phyle), meaning "tribe", and most likely refers to the tightly clustered flowers or the spreading, mat-like growth. Members of the genus are known generally as fogfruit or frogfruit. Species once classified in the genus Lippia may be known by the common name lippia. Some species, e.g. Aztec Sweet Herb (P. dulcis), are used in cooking.

== Selected species ==
- Phyla canescens (Kunth) Greene – hairy frogfruit/fogfruit
- Phyla chinensis Lour.
- Phyla cuneifolia (Torr.) Greene – wedgeleaf frogfruit/fogfruit, wedgeleaf
- Phyla dulcis (Trevir.) Moldenke, – Aztec sweet herb, honeyherb, hierba dulce (Spanish), tzopelic-xihuitl (Nahuatl)
- Phyla fruticosa (Mill.) Kennedy – diamondleaf frogfruit/fogfruit
- Phyla × intermedia Moldenke – intermediate frogfruit/fogfruit
- Phyla lanceolata (Michx.) Greene – lanceleaf frogfruit/fogfruit
- Phyla nodiflora (L.) Greene – turkey tangle, sawtooth frogfruit/fogfruit
- Phyla stoechadifolia (L.) Small – southern frogfruit/fogfruit
