= Gardiner Greene =

American businessman (1753–1832)

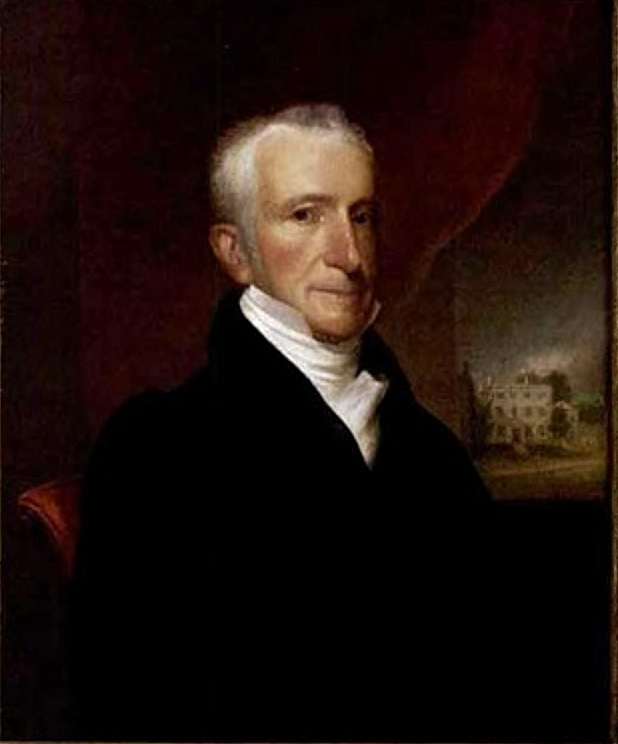
- portrait by John Neagle
- Born: September 23, 1753; Boston
- Died: December 19, 1832 (aged 79); Boston
- Spouse(s): Ann Reading, Elizabeth Hubbard, Elizabeth Copley
- Children: 11, including Benjamin Daniel Greene

Gardiner Greene (1753–1832) was a cotton planter and merchant from Boston, Massachusetts, who conducted business from his plantation, Greenfield, in Demerara (Guyana) in the late 18th and early 19th centuries. Socially prominent in the town of Boston, he owned a house, greenhouse, and garden filled with fruit trees and peacocks on Cotton Hill, opposite Scollay Square. He was also the son-in-law of painter John Singleton Copley.

== Biography ==
Greene was born in Boston, September 23, 1753, to Benjamin Greene and Mary Chandler. He first travelled to Demerara in 1774. "He resided in Demarara for many years, and laid the foundation of a large fortune" shipping cotton, coffee, rum, and the like. The plantation he owned there, Greenfield, was home to over 200 enslaved people in 1817. Associates there included William Parkinson, a plantation owner in Mahaica.

Around 1804 in Boston Greene and business associates William Tudor, Harrison Gray Otis and Jonathan Mason undertook the development of the South Boston Bridge, completed in 1805.

Greene served as an official of the United States Bank and the Provident Institution for Savings. He was a proprietor of the Boston Athenaeum, a member of the Boston Episcopal Charitable Society, and a supporter of the Boston Asylum for Indigent Boys. In Boston, Greene's acquaintances included Kirk Boott (1755–1817) of Bowdoin Square. In 1818, Greene purchased 230 shares of the Suffolk Bank, a clearinghouse bank on State Street in Boston.

=== Pemberton Hill ===
In 1803 Greene bought land in Boston on Pemberton Hill (i.e. Cotton Hill), from Tremont Street (opposite Court Street) to Somerset Street, including the former house of William Vassall (built c. 1758). The Greene family lived there for several decades, until c. 1835. The estate was known for its sweeping harbor views and lush "hillside garden." An acquaintance of the family, Marshall Pinckney Wilder, described the grounds:

"The most conspicuous and elegant garden of those days [in Boston] was that of Gardiner Greene, who had one of the early green-houses of Boston. The grounds were terraced and planted with vines, fruits, ornamental trees, flowering shrubs and plants. ... Here were growing in the open air Black Hamburg and White Chasselas grapes, apricots, nectarines, peaches, pears and plums. ... Here were many ornamental trees brought from foreign lands."

One of Greene's children, Martha Babcock Greene Amory, also remembered the remarkable garden. "'In those primitive days ... the gardener, like the plants, had to be imported expressly from the old country,' according to Greene's daughter. Their gardener was Scottish; he tended the fruit trees and the quaint box-edged beds. ... At the back of the garden, the stable and cow shed were guarded by the 'fierce mastiff, Pedro,' whose fur Miss Greene made into mittens."

=== Family ===
In 1785 he married Ann Reading (1762–1786), who died the next year. He was married again in 1788, to Elizabeth Hubbard (1760–1797). In 1800 he married his third wife, Elizabeth Clarke Copley (1770–1866), whom he had met in London. "She was the daughter of John Singleton Copley and the sister of John, afterwards Baron Lyndhurst, three times Lord Chancellor of England. Her mother was Susanna Farnham, daughter of Richard Clarke, the merchant to whom was consigned the tea which was destroyed by the Boston Tea Party." Greene also served as J.S. Copley's agent in Boston for some 20 years.

Greene's descendants included children Mary Anne Greene (1790–1827), Gardiner Greene (1792–1797), Benjamin Daniel Greene (born 1793), William Parkinson Greene (born 1795), Gardiner Greene (1802–1810), Elizabeth Hubbard Greene (1804–1844), Susannah Clarke Greene (1805–1844), Sara Greene (1808–1863), John Singleton Copley Greene (1810–1872), 2x great-granddaughter Mabel Gardiner Hubbard, wife of Alexander Graham Bell. Martha Babcock Greene Amory (1812–1880), Mary Copley Greene (1817–1892); and grandson Gardiner Greene Hubbard.

== Images ==
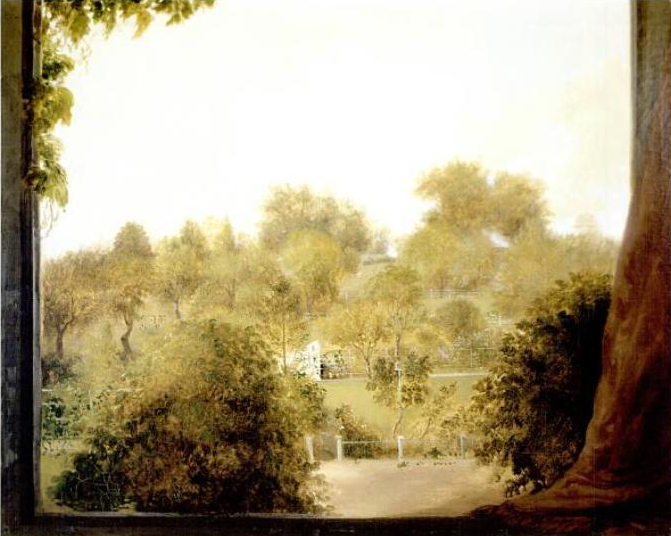
Greene's garden, Pemberton Hill, Boston, 1803-c. 1832

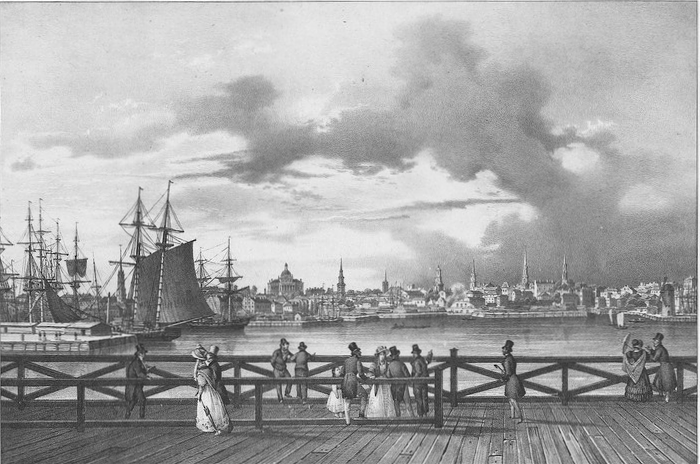
South Boston Bridge (built 1805), an investment of Greene's

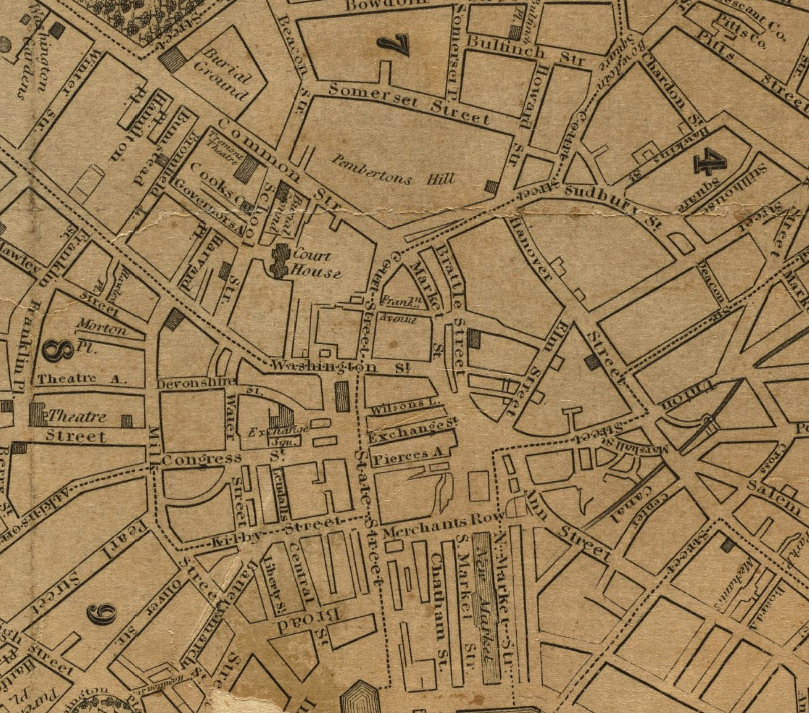
Detail of 1829 map of Boston, showing Pemberton Hill and vicinity

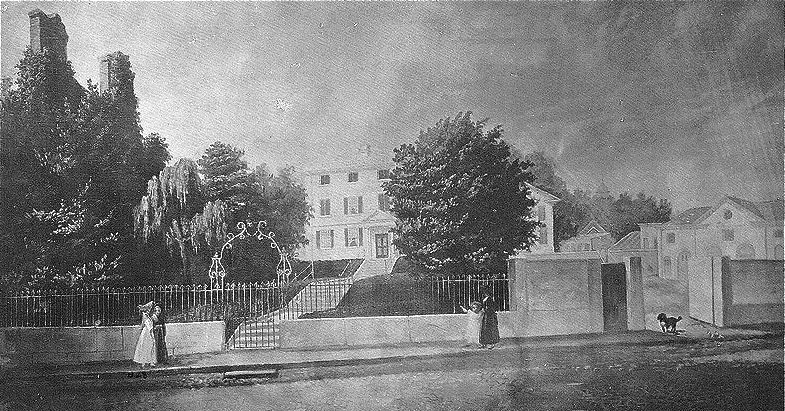
House of Gardiner Greene, Tremont St., Boston, by H.C. Pratt, 1834

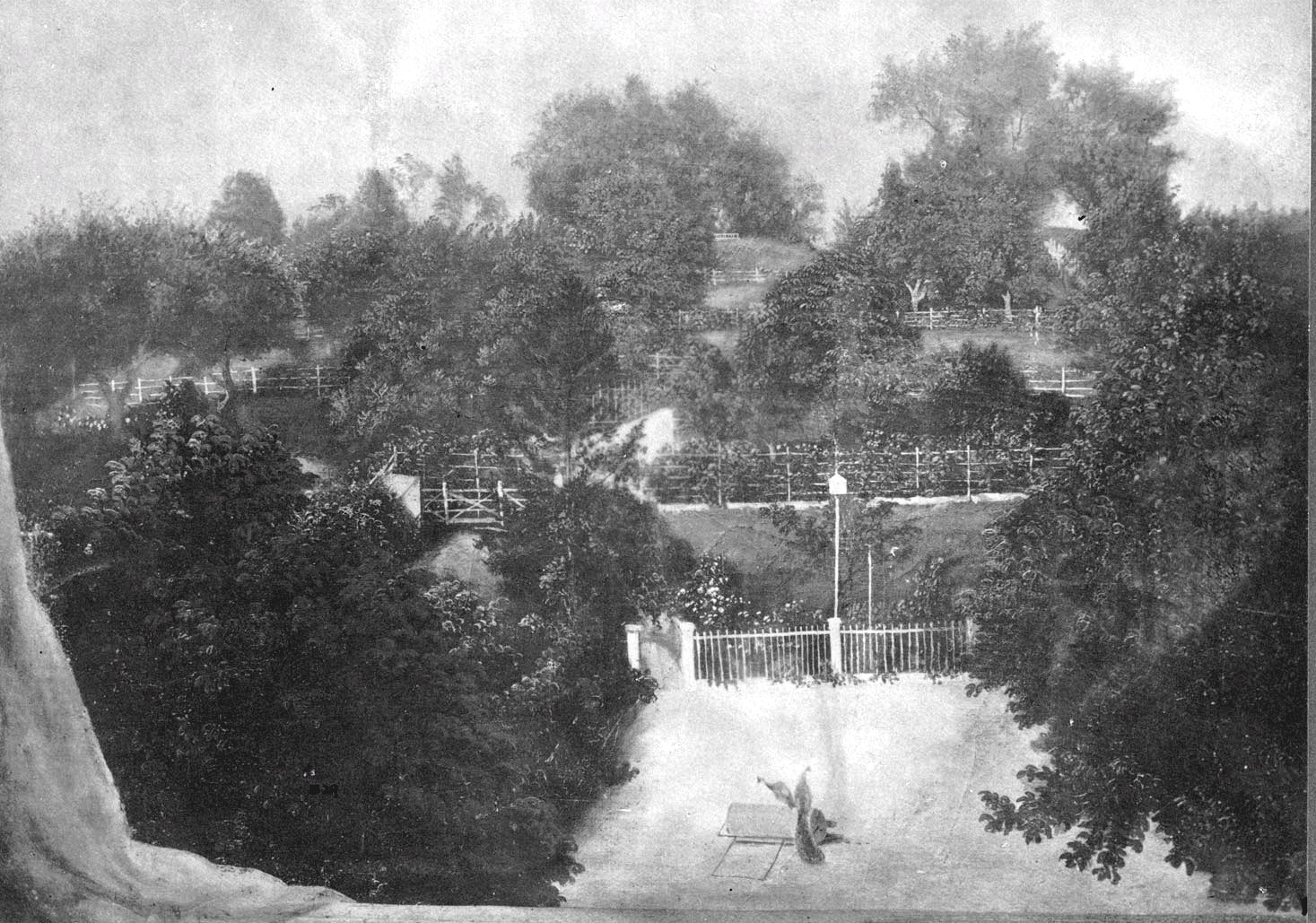
Greene's garden, Boston, 19th century

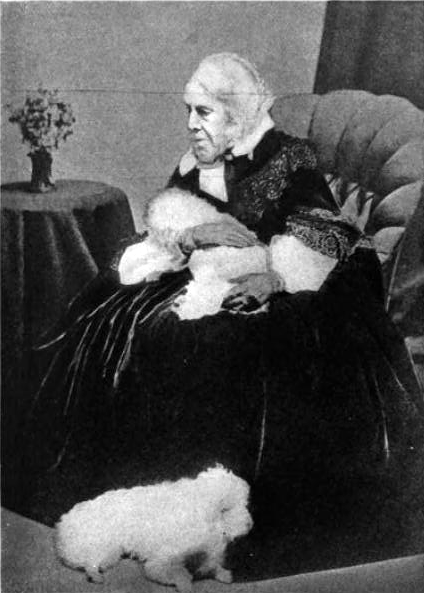
Greene's third wife, Elizabeth Clarke Copley, daughter of painter J.S. Copley
