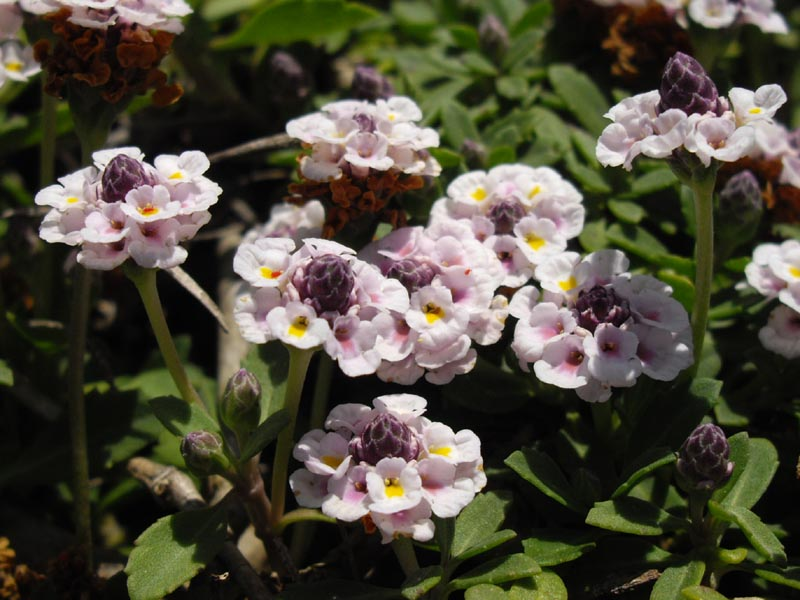

Conservation status
- Least Concern (IUCN 3.1)

Scientific classification
- Kingdom: Plantae
- Clade: Tracheophytes
- Clade: Angiosperms
- Clade: Eudicots
- Clade: Asterids
- Order: Lamiales
- Family: Verbenaceae
- Genus: Phyla
- Species: P. nodiflora

Binomial name
- Phyla nodiflora (L.) Greene

Synonyms
- Blairia nodiflora (L.) Gaertn.; Lippia nodiflora (L.) Michx.; Lippia nodiflora var. normalis Kuntze; Platonia nodiflora (L.) Raf.; Verbena nodiflora L.; Zappania nodiflora (L.) Lam.

= Phyla nodiflora =

Species of flowering plant

Phyla nodiflora, commonly known as lippia, kurapia, turkey tangle frogfruit, capeweed, and frogfruit, is a species of flowering plant in the family Verbenaceae. It can be found in the tropics around the globe. It is often grown as an ornamental plant for ground cover, and is often present in yards or disturbed areas.

== Description ==
The inflorescence consists of a purple centre encircled by small white-to-pink flowers. The flower takes on a match-like look, which is why the plant is sometimes called matchweed.

It is similar to the related species Phyla lanceolata, but differs in having much shorter leaves that are often blunt and much more rounded. Both species are common as weeds and in the ornamental environment.

== Habitat and Distribution ==
P. nodiflora has been found throughout North America, Asia, and Africa.

It is most commonly found in moist habitats with poorly to well-drained soils.

== Ecology ==
P. nodiflora acts as a common nectar source and is the host plant for various butterflies, including the white peacock.
