= Phyla cuneifolia =

Scientific classification
- Kingdom: Plantae
- Clade: Tracheophytes
- Clade: Angiosperms
- Clade: Eudicots
- Clade: Asterids
- Order: Lamiales
- Family: Verbenaceae
- Genus: Phyla
- Species: P. cuneifolia

Binomial name
- Phyla cuneifolia (Torr.) Greene

Species of flowering plant

Phyla cuneifolia is a species of plant in the family Verbenaceae. The species is known as the wedgeleaf frogfruit or wedgeleaf fogfruit.
