= Charles Thomas Jackson =

American physician and scientist (1805–1880)

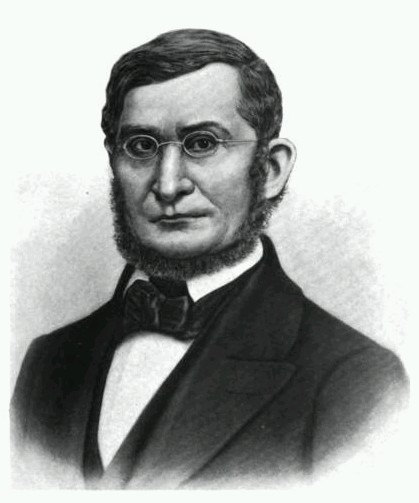
- Charles Thomas Jackson
- Born: June 21, 1805; Plymouth, Massachusetts, US
- Died: August 28, 1880 (aged 75); Somerville, Massachusetts, US
- Spouse: Susan Bridge
- Scientific career
- Fields: Geology, Chemistry, Medicine

Signature
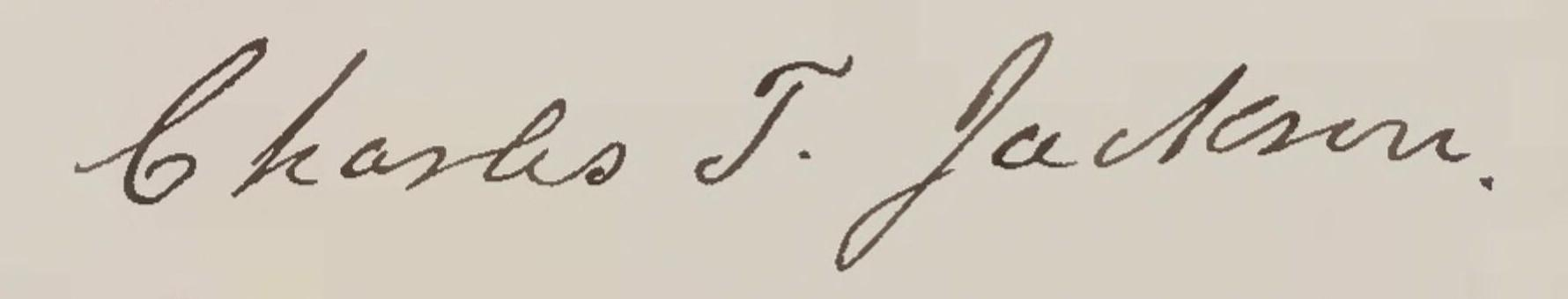

Charles Thomas Jackson (June 21, 1805 – August 28, 1880) was an American medical doctor and scientist who was active in medicine, chemistry, mineralogy, and geology.

== Life and work ==
Born at Plymouth, Massachusetts, of a prominent New England family, he was a brother-in-law of Ralph Waldo Emerson and a graduate of the Harvard Medical School in 1829, where he won the Boylston prize for his dissertation. While at Harvard he made a geological exploration of Nova Scotia with his friend Francis Alger of Boston, which helped to increasingly turn his interests toward geology. In 1829, he traveled to Europe where he studied both medicine and geology for several years and made the acquaintance of prominent European scientists and physicians.

He married Susan Bridge(1816-1899) in 27 February, 1834.

Upon returning to the United States he played an active role in the new state geological survey movement, serving successively between 1836 and 1844 as the state geologist of Maine, Rhode Island, and New Hampshire. In 1844–45, he was an on-site mining consultant to the Lake Superior Copper Company, one of the first companies to attempt mining the native copper deposits of Michigan's Keweenaw Peninsula on Lake Superior.

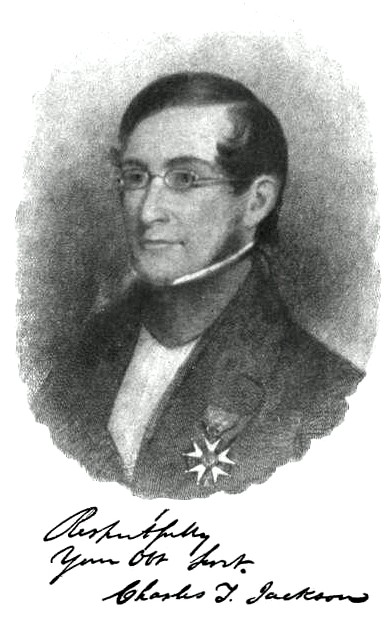
Charles Thomas Jackson

In 1847, Jackson was appointed United States Geologist for the Lake Superior land district, which was about to become one of the major copper-producing regions of the world. His leadership of that survey proved to be a disaster, and he was dismissed from his position and the completion of the survey was turned over to his assistants John Wells Foster and Josiah Dwight Whitney.

Jackson is particularly remembered for his involvement in a series of often bitter priority conflicts that left their marks on the scientific and social scenes of his day. They followed a standard pattern: a discovery would be announced by someone, Jackson would then claim prior discovery, and a controversy would ensue. Among them were conflicts over the discovery of guncotton (Christian Friedrich Schönbein), the telegraph (Samuel F. B. Morse), the digestive action of the stomach (William Beaumont), and the anesthetic effects of ether (William T. G. Morton).

Jackson also made a similar priority claim (1849) for the discovery that the unusual native copper deposits of Lake Superior, contrary to all previous geological expectations, could be successfully mined, although at that time it was universally acknowledged that credit for that discovery belonged to the recently deceased Douglass Houghton, Michigan's first state geologist. In this case, however, the historical evidence does indicate that Jackson's claim for himself was valid, and his mineralogical insights were in advance of those of his contemporaries, including Houghton.

He became a member of the Boston Society of Natural History in 1832. The first volume of Boston Journal of Natural History contain his works. He contributed his geological specimens, roughly 700 of them in number, to be displayed in the museum. From May 1, 1833, his position at BSNH was curator. And later, from May 2, 1838, curator of mineralogy and geology. On May 5, 1841, he became the second vice president, and became the first vice president on May 17, 1843. He stayed in this position until May 6, 1874.

On June 28, 1873, Jackson was hospitalized at McLean Hospital. It is widely believed that the reason was mental illness, either through a seizure, or having a manic episode upon seeing Morton's tombstone. The latter became the wide-believed reason for the hospitalization after it first appeared in René Fülöp-Miller's book, Triumph Over Pain (1938). In fact, Jackson suffered a left brain stroke that affected his language area. While he never regained his speech, he was cooperative and did not exhibit "inappropriate behavior of insanity". By unanimous vote of the McLean Asylum Trustees, Jackson was hosted as a guest at the hospital at no charge for the entire duration of his stay as a recognition of his past contributions.

He died on August 29, 1880, in the above mentioned Hospital. He is buried at Mount Auburn Cemetery in Cambridge, Massachusetts, as is Dr. William T. G. Morton.

In an article published on the Journal of Anesthesia History, Ramon F. Martin and Sukumar P. Desai analyze Jackson's life from psychobiographical view. They suggest that Jackson might had attention deficit hyperactivity disorder, and/or oppositional defiant disorder.

== Legacy ==
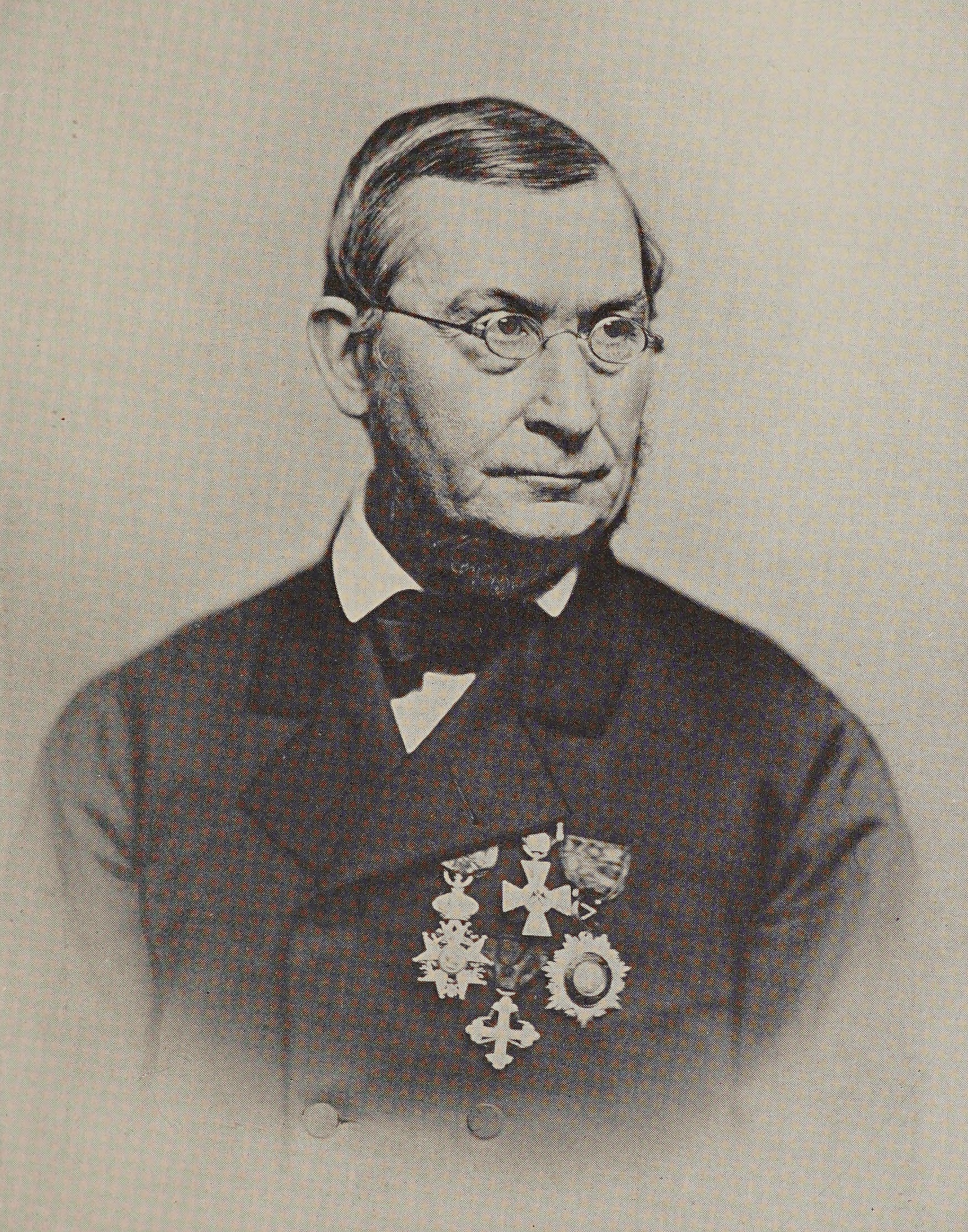
Photograph of C. T. Jackson. Awards worn in this picture, listed clockwise starting from north: Order of the Red Eagle, Order of the Medjidie (Mar 19, 1855), Order of Saints Maurice and Lazarus, and Legion of Honour.

He was elected as a fellow of the American Academy of Arts and Sciences in 1837.

He received multiple awards from different parts of Europe after the claim of the discovery of ether anesthesia. Some of them he is seen wearing in photographs. In 1849, he received the gold medal of merit, which was made specially for him, from the King Oscar of Sweden. On March 18, 1850, the French Academy of Sciences awarded Montyon Prize of 5,000 francs to Jackson and Morton, divided equally between the two. They credited Jackson as the discoverer of etherization, and Morton as the first one to apply said discovery to surgical operations.

In 2021, residents of the town of Jackson, New Hampshire, voted to replace President Andrew Jackson with Charles Thomas Jackson as the namesake of the town.

== Selected writings ==
- Jackson, Charles Thomas; Alger, Francis (1831). "Remarks on the Mineralogy and Geology of Nova Scotia". Memoirs of the American Academy of Arts and Sciences. 1.
- Jackson, Charles Thomas (1861). A Manual of Etherization: Containing Directions for the Employment of Ether. Boston: J. B. Mansfield.
