= Ephraim W. Bouvé =

Ephraim W. Bouvé (c. 1817-1897) was an engraver in Boston, Massachusetts, in the 19th century. Around 1848 he kept a studio on Washington Street. By 1863 he had moved his studio to Bromfield Street, and by 1883 moved again, to Milk Street. E.W. Bouvé served as a judge in the category for "paper, blank books, stationery, etc." in the 1887 exhibition of the Massachusetts Charitable Mechanic Association.

There were two lithographers called "E.W. Bouvé" in Boston in the 1840s: Ephraim and Elisha. The latter was probably related to the Boston cabinetmaker Ephraim Osborn Bouvé; they shared a home on Cooper Street.
