= Benjamin Daniel Greene =

American lawyer, physician, naturalist and botanist (1793 – 1862)

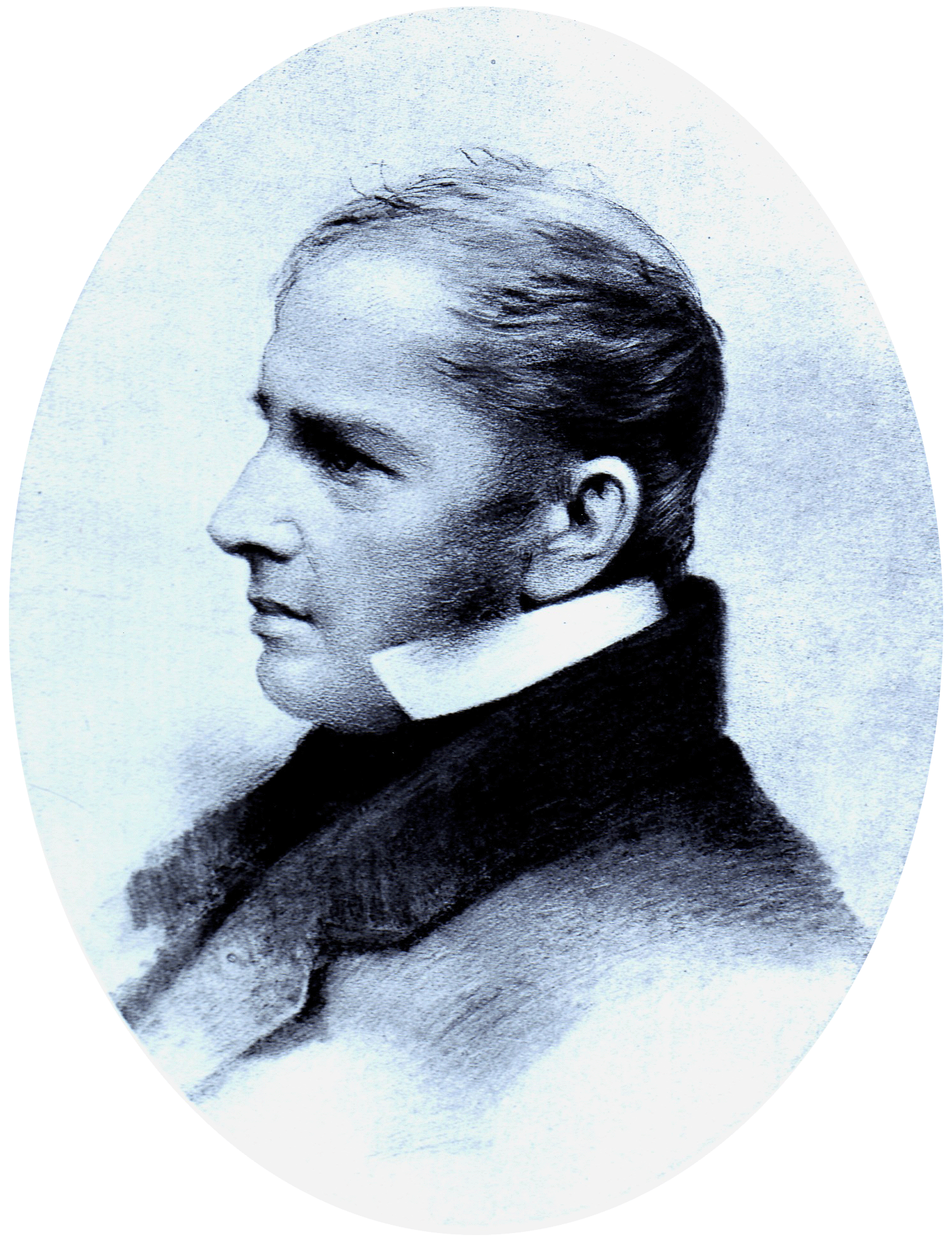
Benjamin Daniel Greene (circa 1840)

Benjamin Daniel Greene (1793 – 1862) was an American lawyer, medical doctor, naturalist, and botanist.

== Biography ==
Benjamin Daniel Greene, a son of Gardiner Greene, was born 29 December 1793, in the colony of Demerara, which was part of Dutch Guiana at the time (it would become part of British Guiana in the 19th-century). He grew up in Boston, Massachusetts, where he received his secondary education at Boston Latin School. He graduated from Harvard College in 1812 and then studied at Litchfield Law School. In September 1815 he was admitted to the bar in Suffolk County, Massachusetts and then practiced law in Boston. However, he soon gave up his legal practice to study medicine in Edinburgh and Paris. He acquired his higher medical doctorate in Edinburgh in 1821, but subsequently spent most of his time studying natural science, especially botany. He put together an extensive herbarium and a valuable botanical library. His botanical study dealt with seed plants.

Greene was one of the founders of the Boston Society of Natural History in 1830 and was its first president, holding that office until 1837. To the Boston Society of Natural History, he bequeathed his herbarium and botanical library in 1857 and $9,000 upon his death.

In 1832 he was elected a fellow of the American Academy of Arts and Sciences. He was a friend of William J. Hooker and corresponded extensively with him.

In May 1826 Greene married Margaret Morton Quincy (1806–1882). There were no children from the marriage.

He died on 14 October 1862 in Boston.

== Eponyms ==
- Greenea Wight & Arn.
