= Henry Sargent Codman =

American landscape architect

Henry Sargent Codman (1859–1893) was an American landscape architect in Frederick Law Olmsted's celebrated design firm. He was Charles Sprague Sargent's nephew.

At the age of twenty-five he studied in France with Édouard André, the French landscape architect soon to be appointed head of the Versailles school.

He died suddenly while recuperating from an appendectomy on January 13, 1893, while working on the landscape development for the World's Columbian Exposition in Chicago. Daniel H. Burnham later wrote of his work on the exposition grounds: "Harry Codman's knowledge of formal settings was greater than that of all the others put together.... Harry Codman was great in his knowledge and in his instincts. He never failed. He liked to come to the business meetings and occasionally he made an excellent suggestion about organization. I loved the man. Nature spoke through him direct."
