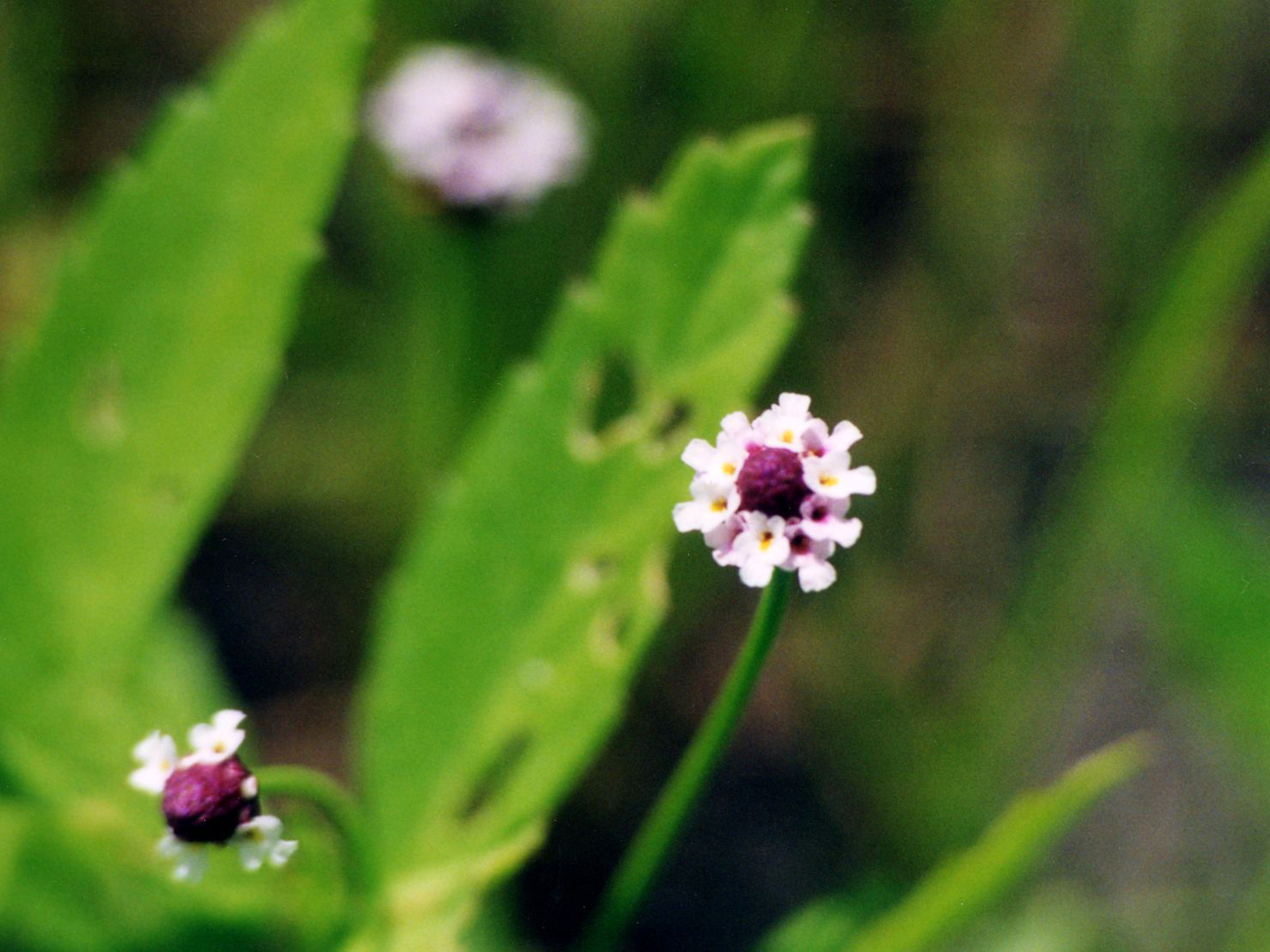

Scientific classification
- Kingdom: Plantae
- Clade: Tracheophytes
- Clade: Angiosperms
- Clade: Eudicots
- Clade: Asterids
- Order: Lamiales
- Family: Verbenaceae
- Genus: Phyla
- Species: P. lanceolata

Binomial name
- Phyla lanceolata (Michx.) Greene

Synonyms
- Lippia lanceolata

= Phyla lanceolata =

Species of flowering plant

Phyla lanceolata is a species of flowering plant in the verbena family known by the common names lanceleaf fogfruit, fogfruit, or frogfruit. It is native to the southern half of North America, including much of the United States except for the northwestern quadrant, and much of Mexico. It is resident in many types of moist and wet habitat, including disturbed areas, such as irrigation ditches. It is a perennial herb growing decumbent in a matlike form with spreading, trailing stems up to 50 centimeters (19.7 in) long, sometimes rooting at nodes. The lance-shaped or nearly oval leaves are up to 6 centimeters (2.4 in) long and have toothed or partially toothed edges. The inflorescence, arising on a peduncle several centimeters tall, is a spherical spike of flowers which elongates into a cylindrical form as the fruits develop. The tiny, densely packed flowers are white, sometimes tinged with blue or purple.

It is similar to the related species Phyla nodiflora, but differs in having much longer and more pointed leaves. Both species are common as weeds and in the ornamental environment.

An older scientific name for this species is Lippia lanceolata, and in some older references 'frogfruit' is provided as a common name.

The Acadian French name for the plant is "caille eau," stemming from the superstition that it can curdle water.
