= Chelymorpha multipunctata =

Scientific classification
- Kingdom: Animalia
- Phylum: Arthropoda
- Clade: Pancrustacea
- Class: Insecta
- Order: Coleoptera
- Suborder: Polyphaga
- Infraorder: Cucujiformia
- Family: Chrysomelidae
- Genus: Chelymorpha
- Species: C. multipunctata

Binomial name
- Chelymorpha multipunctata (Olivier, 1790)

Synonyms
- Cassida multipunctata Olivier, 1790; Chelymorpha puncticollis Boheman, 1854

Species of beetle

Chelymorpha multipunctata is a species of beetle of the family Chrysomelidae. It is found in Argentina, Bolivia, Brazil (Amapá, Amazonas, Distrito Federal, Espírito Santo, Goiás, Mato Grosso, Minas Gerais, Pará, Paraná, Rio de Janeiro, Rio Grande do Norte, Rio Grande do Sul, São Paulo), Colombia, Costa Rica, Dominica, Dominican Republic, Ecuador, French Guiana, Grenada, Guadeloupe, Panama, Paraguay, Peru, St. Vincent, Trinidad, Venezuela and the United States.

== Taxonomy ==
For a long time, Chelymorpha multipunctata was known under the name Chelymorpha cribraria, however, the name was misapplied and true cribraria has been synonymized with Chelymorpha cassidea.
