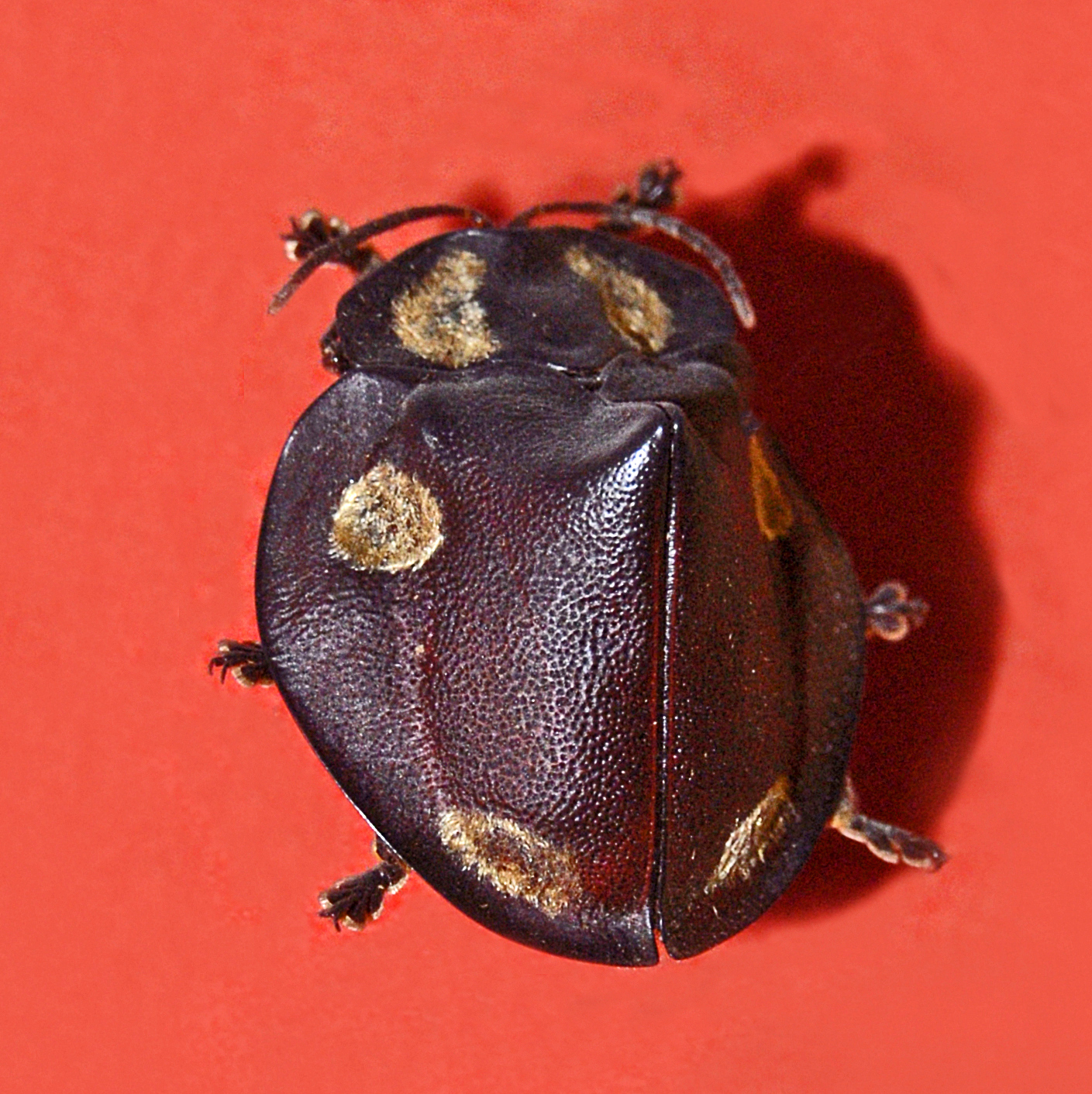
- Museum specimen of Mesomphalia turrita

Scientific classification
- Kingdom: Animalia
- Phylum: Arthropoda
- Clade: Pancrustacea
- Class: Insecta
- Order: Coleoptera
- Suborder: Polyphaga
- Infraorder: Cucujiformia
- Family: Chrysomelidae
- Subfamily: Cassidinae
- Tribe: Mesomphaliini
- Genus: Mesomphalia
- Species: M. turritas

Binomial name
- Mesomphalia turritas (Illiger, 1801)

= Mesomphalia turrita =

Species of beetle

Mesomphalia turrita is a species of leaf beetles belonging to the family Chrysomelidae. This species occurs in Brazil.
