= Zatrephina lineata =

Scientific classification
- Kingdom: Animalia
- Phylum: Arthropoda
- Clade: Pancrustacea
- Class: Insecta
- Order: Coleoptera
- Suborder: Polyphaga
- Infraorder: Cucujiformia
- Family: Chrysomelidae
- Genus: Zatrephina
- Species: Z. lineata

Binomial name
- Zatrephina lineata (Fabricius, 1787)

Synonyms
- Cassida lineata Fabricius, 1787; Cassida obsoleta Olivier, 1808; Zatrephina meticulosa Spaeth, 1909

Species of beetle

Zatrephina lineata is a species of beetle of the family Chrysomelidae. It is found in Brazil (Amapá, Pará, Paraíba, Pernambuco, Rio de Janeiro, São Paulo), Colombia, French Guiana, Paraguay and Venezuela.

== Life history ==
The recorded host plants are Ipomoea batatas and Ipomoea asarifolia.
