= Hilarocassis =

Scientific classification
- Kingdom: Animalia
- Phylum: Arthropoda
- Clade: Pancrustacea
- Class: Insecta
- Order: Coleoptera
- Suborder: Polyphaga
- Infraorder: Cucujiformia
- Family: Chrysomelidae
- Tribe: Mesomphaliini
- Genus: Hilarocassis; Spaeth, 1913

Genus of beetles

Hilarocassis is a genus of tortoise beetles and hispines in the family Chrysomelidae. There are about 10 described species in Hilarocassis.

== Species ==
These 10 species belong to the genus Hilarocassis:

- Hilarocassis albida (Germar, 1824)
- Hilarocassis bordoni Borowiec, 2002
- Hilarocassis evanida (Boheman, 1850)
- Hilarocassis exclamationis (Linnaeus, 1767)
- Hilarocassis maculicollis Swietojanska, 2003
- Hilarocassis nigritarsis (Boheman, 1854)
- Hilarocassis quinquelineata Spaeth, 1913
- Hilarocassis rubripennis (Spaeth, 1922)
- Hilarocassis suturella (Boheman, 1850)
- Hilarocassis venusta (Boheman, 1854)
