= Stolas fasciculosa =

Scientific classification
- Kingdom: Animalia
- Phylum: Arthropoda
- Clade: Pancrustacea
- Class: Insecta
- Order: Coleoptera
- Suborder: Polyphaga
- Infraorder: Cucujiformia
- Family: Chrysomelidae
- Genus: Stolas
- Species: S. fasciculosa

Binomial name
- Stolas fasciculosa (Spaeth, 1909)

Synonyms
- Pseudomesomphalia fasciculosa Spaeth, 1909

Species of beetle

Stolas fasciculosa is a species of beetle of the family Chrysomelidae. It is found in Brazil (Pernambuco).
