= Paraselenis solieri =

Scientific classification
- Kingdom: Animalia
- Phylum: Arthropoda
- Clade: Pancrustacea
- Class: Insecta
- Order: Coleoptera
- Suborder: Polyphaga
- Infraorder: Cucujiformia
- Family: Chrysomelidae
- Genus: Paraselenis
- Species: P. solieri

Binomial name
- Paraselenis solieri (Boheman, 1854)

Synonyms
- Omoplata solieri Boheman, 1854

Species of beetle

Paraselenis solieri is a species of beetle of the family Chrysomelidae. It is found in Brazil (Bahia, Pernambuco). Records from French Guiana and Suriname are based on misidentifications of Paraselenis flava.

== Life history ==
The recorded host plant is Ipomoea batatas.
