= Stolas discoides =

Scientific classification
- Kingdom: Animalia
- Phylum: Arthropoda
- Clade: Pancrustacea
- Class: Insecta
- Order: Coleoptera
- Suborder: Polyphaga
- Infraorder: Cucujiformia
- Family: Chrysomelidae
- Genus: Stolas
- Species: S. discoides

Binomial name
- Stolas discoides (Linnaeus, 1758)

Synonyms
- Cassida discoides Linnaeus, 1758; Cassida bipustula Linnaeus, 1763; Cassida quadrimaculata De Geer, 1775; Cassida cuprea Fabricius, 1787; Cassida tetrastigma Lichtenstein, 1795; Cassida phlyctaena Lichtenstein, 1795; Cassida pavonina Lichtenstein, 1795; Cassida decussata Herbst, 1799; Cassida discors Fabricius, 1801; Cassida didyma Olivier, 1808; Cassida nitidula Olivier, 1808; Cassida 12-pustulata Olivier, 1790; Mesomphalia chalcoptera Boheman, 1850

Species of beetle

Stolas discoides is a species of beetle of the family Chrysomelidae. It is found in Argentina, Bolivia, Brazil (Amazonas, Pernambuco), Colombia, Costa Rica, Ecuador, French Guiana, Honduras, Peru, Suriname, Trinidad and Tobago and Venezuela.

== Life history ==
The recorded host plant is Ipomoea batatas.
