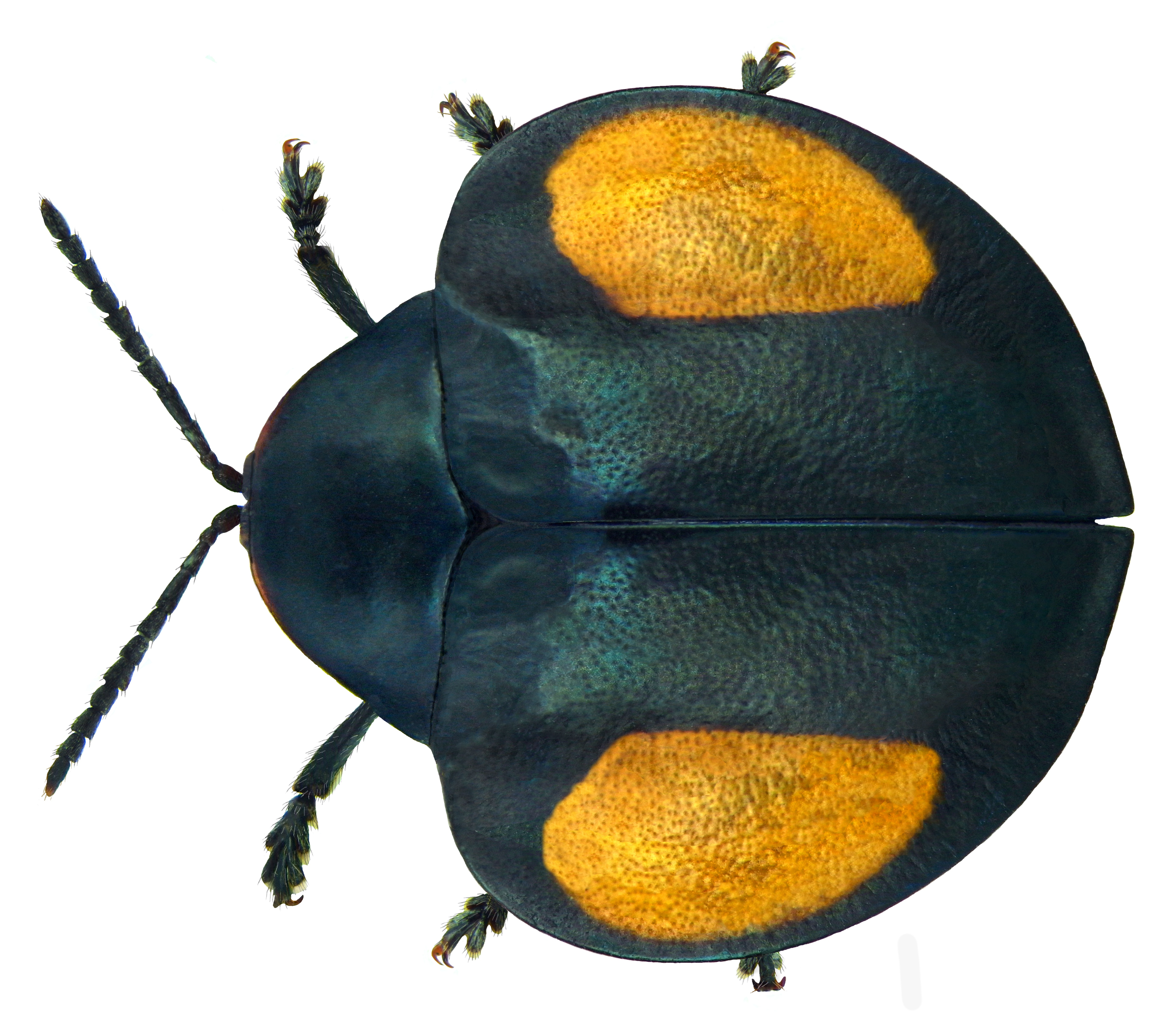
- Omaspides erichsoni

Scientific classification
- Kingdom: Animalia
- Phylum: Arthropoda
- Clade: Pancrustacea
- Class: Insecta
- Order: Coleoptera
- Suborder: Polyphaga
- Infraorder: Cucujiformia
- Family: Chrysomelidae
- Subfamily: Cassidinae
- Tribe: Mesomphaliini
- Genus: Omaspides; Chevrolat in Dejean, 1836

Synonyms
- Parechoma Spaeth, 1913; Paromaspides Spaeth, 1913; Omapsides Erichson, 1847

= Omaspides =

Genus of leaf beetles

Omaspides is a genus of leaf beetles of the family Chrysomelidae.

== Species ==
- subgenus Omaspides
  - Omaspides abbreviata Baly, 1872
  - Omaspides amazonica Spaeth, 1937
  - Omaspides augusta Boheman, 1856
  - Omaspides basilica Boheman, 1856
  - Omaspides bioculata Boheman, 1862
  - Omaspides bistriata Boheman, 1862
  - Omaspides bivittata Baly, 1872
  - Omaspides boliviana Borowiec, 2003
  - Omaspides clathrata (Linnaeus, 1758)
  - Omaspides collecta Spaeth, 1937
  - Omaspides confusa Borowiec, 2010
  - Omaspides conjugens Spaeth, 1937
  - Omaspides convexicollis Spaeth, 1909
  - Omaspides curiosa Borowiec & Takizawa, 2011
  - Omaspides ellipsigera Spaeth, 1937
  - Omaspides erichsoni Spaeth, 1937
  - Omaspides flavofasciata Spaeth, 1909
  - Omaspides helleri Spaeth, 1915
  - Omaspides iheringi (Spaeth, 1909)
  - Omaspides limbipennis Spaeth, 1922
  - Omaspides lunulata Boheman, 1854
  - Omaspides nigrolineata (Boheman, 1854)
  - Omaspides nitidicollis Spaeth, 1937
  - Omaspides pallidipennis (Boheman, 1854)
  - Omaspides picaflorensis Borowiec, 2010
  - Omaspides pulchella Baly, 1859
  - Omaspides quadrifenestrata Spaeth, 1907
  - Omaspides scutaria Spaeth, 1937
  - Omaspides specularis Erichson, 1847
  - Omaspides tenuicula Boheman, 1862
  - Omaspides trichroa (Boheman, 1854)
  - Omaspides tricolorata (Boheman, 1854)
  - Omaspides trifasciata (Fabricius, 1787)
  - Omaspides unicolor Borowiec, 1998
- subgenus Parechoma Spaeth, 1913
  - Omaspides semilineata (Boheman, 1854)
- subgenus Paromaspides Spaeth, 1913
  - Omaspides brunneosignata (Boheman, 1854)
  - Omaspides haematidea (Boheman, 1854)
  - Omaspides sobrina (Boheman, 1854)
  - Omaspides squalida (Boheman, 1854)
  - Omaspides vexabilis (Boheman, 1862)
