= Stolas flavonotata =

Scientific classification
- Kingdom: Animalia
- Phylum: Arthropoda
- Clade: Pancrustacea
- Class: Insecta
- Order: Coleoptera
- Suborder: Polyphaga
- Infraorder: Cucujiformia
- Family: Chrysomelidae
- Genus: Stolas
- Species: S. flavonotata

Binomial name
- Stolas flavonotata (Boheman, 1856)

Synonyms
- Mesomphalia flavonotata Boheman, 1856

Species of beetle

Stolas flavonotata is a species of beetle of the family Chrysomelidae. It is found in Brazil (Pernambuco).
