= Hilarocassis exclamationis =

Scientific classification
- Kingdom: Animalia
- Phylum: Arthropoda
- Clade: Pancrustacea
- Class: Insecta
- Order: Coleoptera
- Suborder: Polyphaga
- Infraorder: Cucujiformia
- Family: Chrysomelidae
- Genus: Hilarocassis
- Species: H. exclamationis

Binomial name
- Hilarocassis exclamationis (Linnaeus, 1767)

Species of beetle

Hilarocassis exclamationis is a species of leaf beetle in the family Chrysomelidae. It is found in the Caribbean Sea, Central America, North America, and South America.
