= Cyrtonota verrucosa =

Scientific classification
- Kingdom: Animalia
- Phylum: Arthropoda
- Clade: Pancrustacea
- Class: Insecta
- Order: Coleoptera
- Suborder: Polyphaga
- Infraorder: Cucujiformia
- Family: Chrysomelidae
- Genus: Cyrtonota
- Species: C. verrucosa

Binomial name
- Cyrtonota verrucosa (Boheman, 1856)

Synonyms
- Mesomphalia verrucosa Boheman, 1856

Species of beetle

Cyrtonota verrucosa is a species of beetle of the family Chrysomelidae. It is found in Brazil (Paraíba, Pernambuco).
