= Cyrtonota sexguttata =

Scientific classification
- Kingdom: Animalia
- Phylum: Arthropoda
- Clade: Pancrustacea
- Class: Insecta
- Order: Coleoptera
- Suborder: Polyphaga
- Infraorder: Cucujiformia
- Family: Chrysomelidae
- Genus: Cyrtonota
- Species: C. sexguttata

Binomial name
- Cyrtonota sexguttata (Spaeth, 1913)

Synonyms
- Neomphalia sexguttata Spaeth, 1913

Species of beetle

Cyrtonota sexguttata is a species of beetle of the family Chrysomelidae. It is found in Brazil (Pernambuco).
