= Chelymorpha marginata =

Scientific classification
- Kingdom: Animalia
- Phylum: Arthropoda
- Clade: Pancrustacea
- Class: Insecta
- Order: Coleoptera
- Suborder: Polyphaga
- Infraorder: Cucujiformia
- Family: Chrysomelidae
- Genus: Chelymorpha
- Species: C. marginata

Binomial name
- Chelymorpha marginata (Linnaeus, 1758)

Synonyms
- Cassida marginata Linnaeus, 1758; Cassida cincta De Geer, 1775; Cassida tuberculata Olivier, 1790; Cassida brunnea Fabricius, 1798

Species of beetle

Chelymorpha marginata is a species of beetle of the family Chrysomelidae. It is found in Bolivia, Brazil (Amapá, Mato Grosso, Pará, Pernambuco, Rio de Janeiro), Colombia, Ecuador, French Guiana, Paraguay, Suriname and Venezuela.

== Life history ==
The recorded host plant is Ipomoea batatas.
