= Stolas antiqua =

Scientific classification
- Kingdom: Animalia
- Phylum: Arthropoda
- Clade: Pancrustacea
- Class: Insecta
- Order: Coleoptera
- Suborder: Polyphaga
- Infraorder: Cucujiformia
- Family: Chrysomelidae
- Genus: Stolas
- Species: S. antiqua

Binomial name
- Stolas antiqua (Sahlberg, 1823)

Synonyms
- Cassida antiqua Sahlberg, 1823; Cassida nodipennis Germar, 1824; Mesomphalia modica Boheman, 1850

Species of beetle

Stolas antiqua is a species of beetle of the family Chrysomelidae. It is found in Argentina, Brazil (Mato Grosso, Paraná, Rio de Janeiro, Rio Grande do Sul, Santa Catarina, Pernambuco, São Paulo) and Paraguay.
