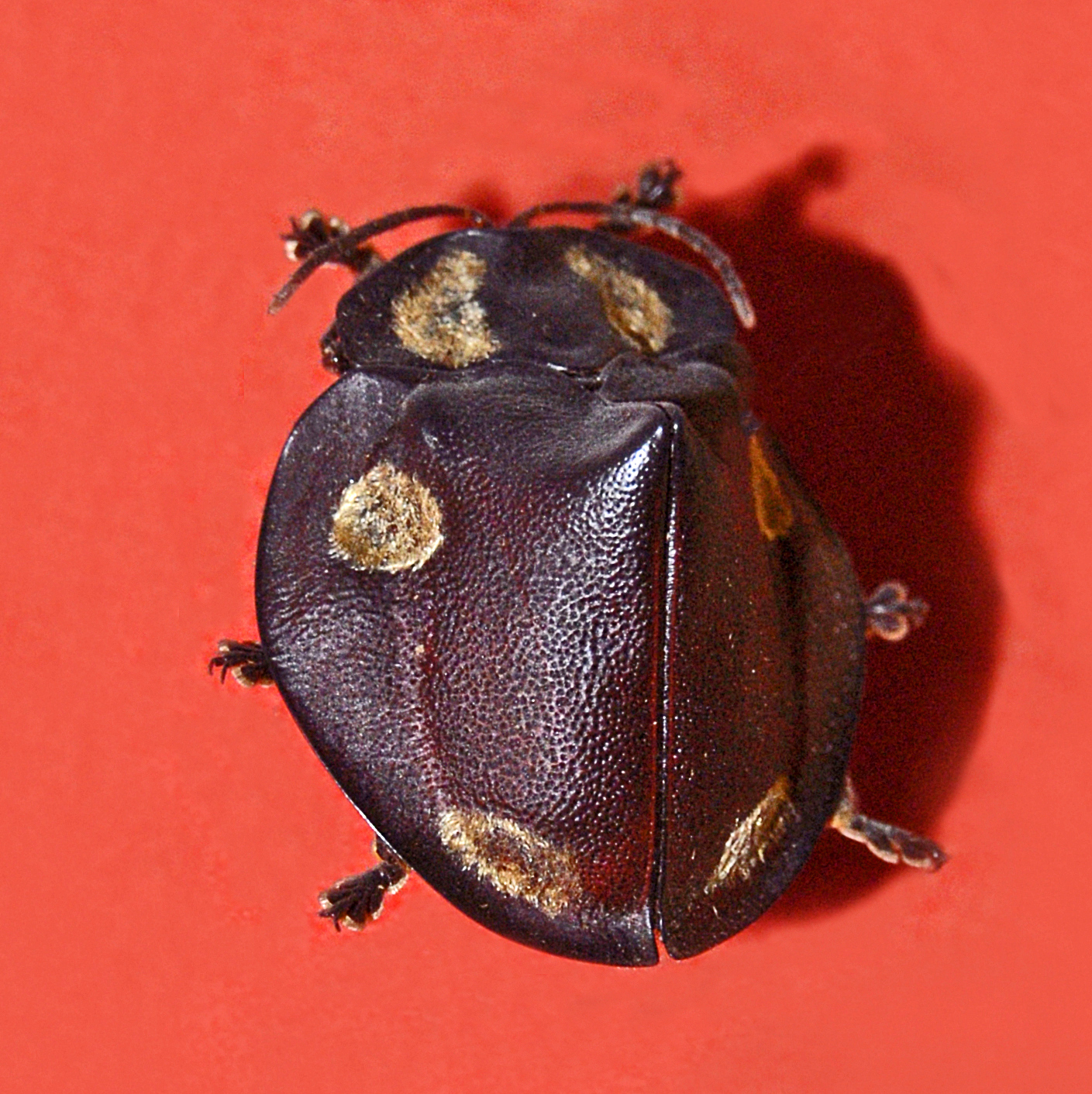
- Museum specimen of Mesomphalia turrita

Scientific classification
- Kingdom: Animalia
- Phylum: Arthropoda
- Clade: Pancrustacea
- Class: Insecta
- Order: Coleoptera
- Suborder: Polyphaga
- Infraorder: Cucujiformia
- Family: Chrysomelidae
- Subfamily: Cassidinae
- Tribe: Mesomphaliini
- Genus: Mesomphalia; Hope, 1839

= Mesomphalia =

Genus of beetles

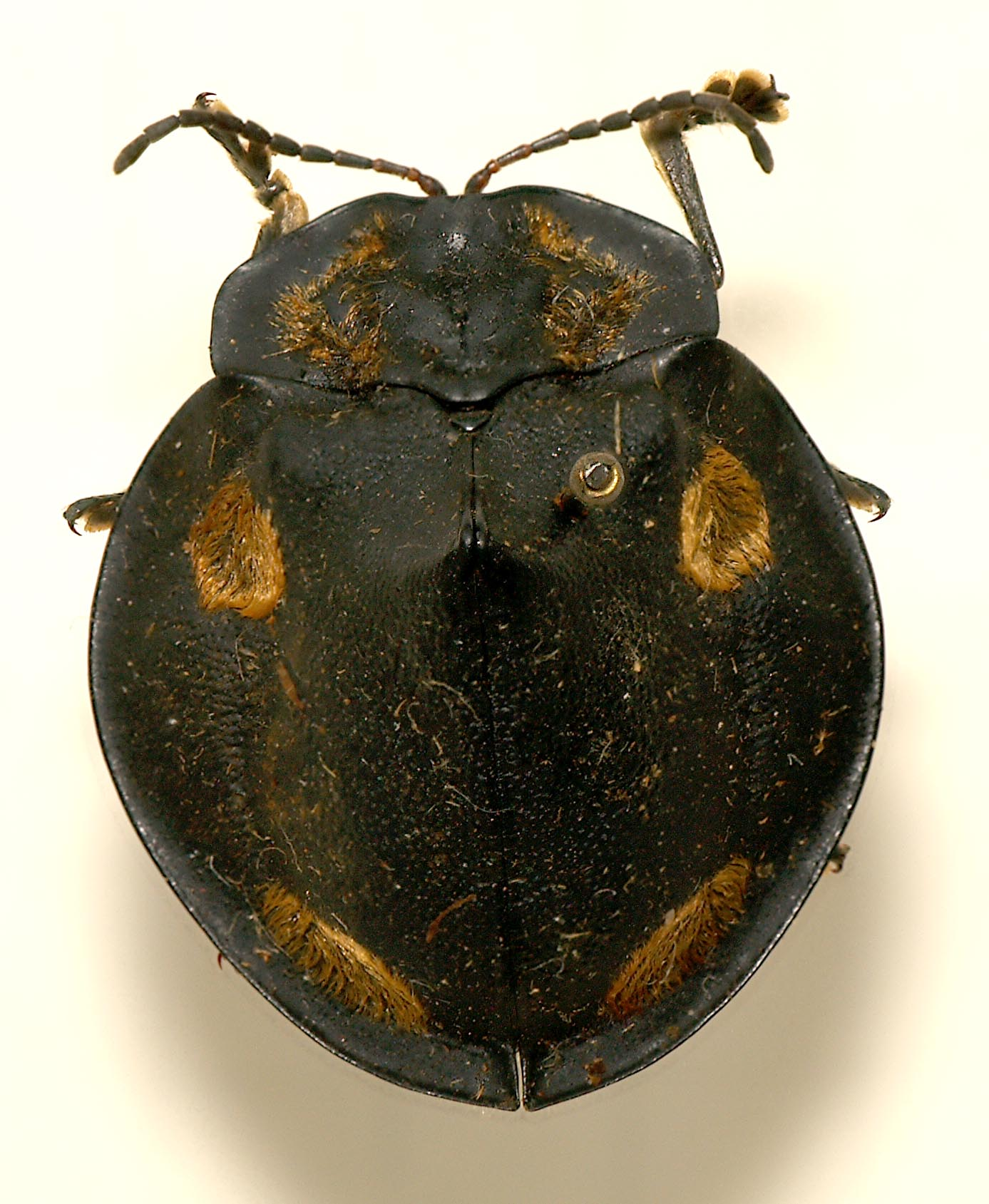
Mesomphalia sexmaculata

Mesomphalia is a genus of leaf beetles in the family Chrysomelidae. There are about 18 described species in Mesomphalia, found in South America.

== Species ==
These 18 species belong to the genus Mesomphalia:

- Mesomphalia albofasciculata Boheman, 1856
- Mesomphalia ampliata Boheman, 1850
- Mesomphalia denudata Boheman, 1850
- Mesomphalia gemmaspis Pongrácz, 1935
- Mesomphalia gibbosa (Fabricius, 1781)
- Mesomphalia latipennis Boheman, 1856
- Mesomphalia nudoplagiata Spaeth, 1901
- Mesomphalia pyramidata Boheman, 1850
- Mesomphalia retipennis Boheman, 1850
- Mesomphalia scrobiculata Boheman, 1850
- Mesomphalia sexmaculata Boheman, 1850
- Mesomphalia sexmaculosa Boheman, 1856
- Mesomphalia spaethi Simoes & Monne
- Mesomphalia sublaevis Boheman, 1850
- Mesomphalia subnitens Spaeth, 1917
- Mesomphalia tumidula Boheman, 1850
- Mesomphalia turrita (Illiger, 1801)
- Mesomphalia variolaris Boheman, 1850
