= Botanochara ruforeticulata =

Scientific classification
- Kingdom: Animalia
- Phylum: Arthropoda
- Clade: Pancrustacea
- Class: Insecta
- Order: Coleoptera
- Suborder: Polyphaga
- Infraorder: Cucujiformia
- Family: Chrysomelidae
- Genus: Botanochara
- Species: B. ruforeticulata

Binomial name
- Botanochara ruforeticulata (Boheman, 1850)

Synonyms
- Poecilaspis rufo-reticulata Boheman, 1850

Species of beetle

Botanochara ruforeticulata is a species of beetle of the family Chrysomelidae. It is found in Brazil (Bahia, Espírito Santo, Goiás, Mato Grosso, Minas Gerais, Rio de Janeiro, Pernambuco, São Paulo).

== Life history ==
The recorded host plants are Ipomoea batatas, Ipomoea pes-caprae and Cucurbita species.
