= Paraselenis =

- Paraselenis puncticollis

Scientific classification
- Kingdom: Animalia
- Phylum: Arthropoda
- Clade: Pancrustacea
- Class: Insecta
- Order: Coleoptera
- Suborder: Polyphaga
- Infraorder: Cucujiformia
- Family: Chrysomelidae
- Subfamily: Cassidinae
- Tribe: Mesomphaliini
- Genus: Paraselenis; Spaeth, 1913

Synonyms
- Spaethiechoma Hincks, 1950; Pseudechoma Spaeth, 1913

Genus of leaf beetles

Paraselenis is a genus of leaf beetles of the family Chrysomelidae.

== Species ==
- subgenus Paraselenis
  - Paraselenis albida Spaeth, 1913
  - Paraselenis axillaris (Sahlberg, 1823)
- subgenus Pseudechoma Spaeth, 1913
  - Paraselenis marginipennis (Spaeth, 1907)
- subgenus Spaethiechoma Hincks, 1950
  - Paraselenis amplicollis (Spaeth, 1907)
  - Paraselenis aulica (Boheman, 1854)
  - Paraselenis brunnidorsis (Spaeth, 1902)
  - Paraselenis collata (Boheman, 1854)
  - Paraselenis contemta (Spaeth, 1907)
  - Paraselenis decipiens (Boheman, 1854)
  - Paraselenis dichroa (Germar, 1824)
  - Paraselenis filia (Spaeth, 1907)
  - Paraselenis flava (Linnaeus, 1758)
  - Paraselenis flavata (Boheman, 1854)
  - Paraselenis flavopunctata Borowiec, 2003
  - Paraselenis generosa (Boheman, 1854)
  - Paraselenis hyalina (Boheman, 1854)
  - Paraselenis jugata (Boheman, 1854)
  - Paraselenis multisinuata (Spaeth, 1909)
  - Paraselenis nigropunctata Borowiec, 2003
  - Paraselenis normalis (Germar, 1824)
  - Paraselenis nupta (Boheman, 1854)
  - Paraselenis punctata (Spaeth, 1907)
  - Paraselenis puncticollis (Spaeth, 1907)
  - Paraselenis saltaensis Borowiec, 2002
  - Paraselenis scapulosa (Boheman, 1854)
  - Paraselenis solieri (Boheman, 1854)
  - Paraselenis suspecta (Spaeth, 1907)
  - Paraselenis tersa (Boheman, 1854)
  - Paraselenis transversalis (Boheman, 1854)
