= Chelymorpha phytophagica =

Scientific classification
- Kingdom: Animalia
- Phylum: Arthropoda
- Clade: Pancrustacea
- Class: Insecta
- Order: Coleoptera
- Suborder: Polyphaga
- Infraorder: Cucujiformia
- Family: Chrysomelidae
- Genus: Chelymorpha
- Species: C. phytophagica

Binomial name
- Chelymorpha phytophagica Crotch, 1873

Species of beetle

Chelymorpha phytophagica is a species of leaf beetle in the family Chrysomelidae. It is found in Central America and North America.

== Subspecies ==
These two subspecies belong to the species Chelymorpha phytophagica:

- Chelymorpha phytophagica luteata Schaeffer
- Chelymorpha phytophagica phytophagica
