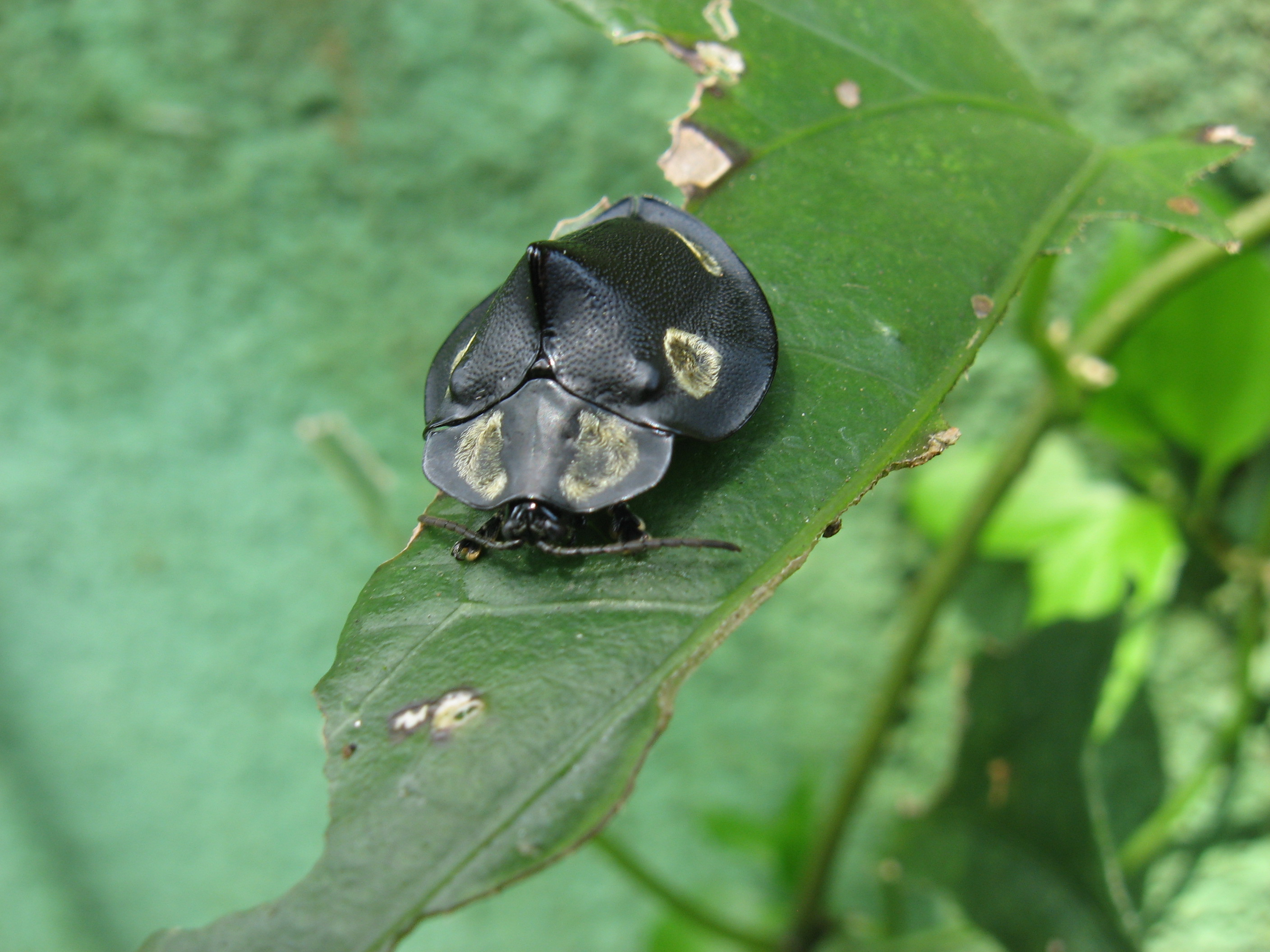
- Mesomphalia turrita

Scientific classification
- Kingdom: Animalia
- Phylum: Arthropoda
- Clade: Pancrustacea
- Class: Insecta
- Order: Coleoptera
- Suborder: Polyphaga
- Infraorder: Cucujiformia
- Family: Chrysomelidae
- Subfamily: Cassidinae
- Tribe: Mesomphaliini; Hope, 1840

Synonyms
- Stolaini Hincks, 1952; Chélymorphites Chapuis, 1875; Elytrogonites Chapuis, 1875; Mesomphaliini Borowiec, 1995; Mésomphaliites Chapuis, 1875; Omoplatites Chapuis, 1875

= Mesomphaliini =

Tribe of beetles

The Mesomphaliini are a tribe of tortoise beetles erected by Frederick William Hope in 1840; however, some authorities place the genera in the tribe name Stolaini Hincks, 1952.

Species are mostly found in the Americas, especially the Neotropical realm, but some may occur elsewhere: for example, Chelymorpha and Stolas have representatives in Europe, with Cyrtonota in Japan.

== Genera ==
The Catalogue of Life includes:

1. Acromis Chevrolat, 1836
2. Amythra Spaeth, 1913
3. Anacassis Spaeth, 1913
4. Anepsiomorpha Spaeth, 1913
5. Botanochara Dejean, 1836
6. Chelymorpha Chevrolat, 1836
7. Convexocoleus Shin, 2013
8. Cyrtonota Chevrolat, 1836
9. Echoma Chevrolat, 1836
10. Elytrogona Chevrolat, 1836
11. Eutheria Spaeth, 1909
12. Hilarocassis Spaeth, 1913
13. Mesomphalia Hope, 1839
14. Nebraspis Spaeth, 1913
15. Ogdoecosta Spaeth, 1909
16. Omaspides Chevrolat, 1836
17. Paraselenis Spaeth, 1913
18. Phytodectoidea Spaeth, 1909
19. Poecilaspidella Spaeth, 1913
20. Stoiba Spaeth, 1909
21. Stolas Billberg, 1820
22. Terpsis Spaeth, 1913
23. Trilaccodea Spaeth, 1902
24. Xenicomorpha Spaeth, 1913
25. Zatrephina Spaeth, 1909
