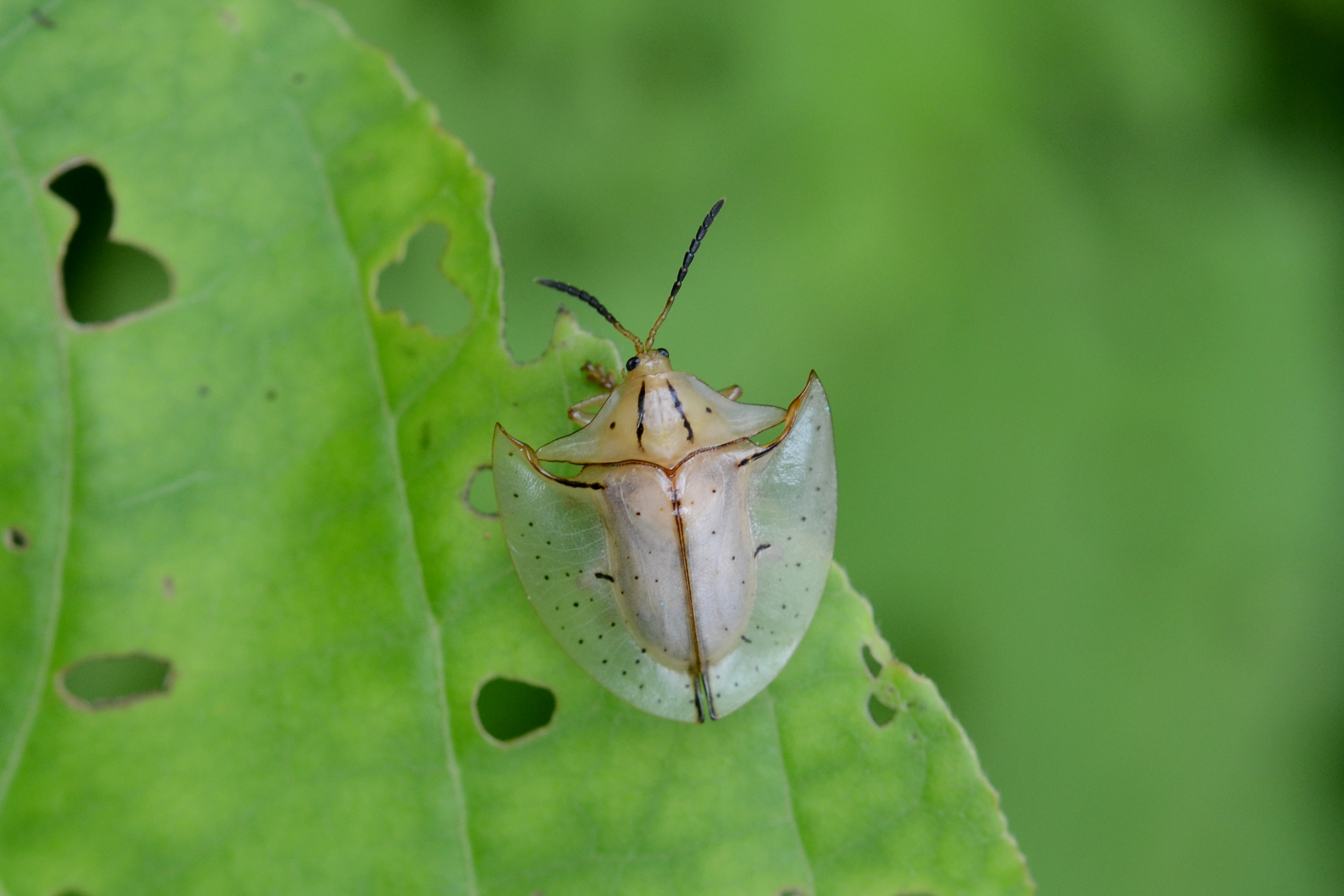
- Acromis sparsa

Scientific classification
- Kingdom: Animalia
- Phylum: Arthropoda
- Clade: Pancrustacea
- Class: Insecta
- Order: Coleoptera
- Suborder: Polyphaga
- Infraorder: Cucujiformia
- Family: Chrysomelidae
- Subfamily: Cassidinae
- Tribe: Mesomphaliini
- Genus: Acromis; Chevrolat in Dejean, 1836

Type species
- Cassida spinifex Linnaeus, 1763

= Acromis =

Genus of tortoise beetles

Acromis is a genus of beetles belonging to the family Chrysomelidae. The three known species of this genus are found in Southern America. These species exhibit subsocial behavior, where the females lay clusters of eggs that she guards until they hatch, the larvae mature, pupate, and young adults disperse.

Species:

- Acromis sparsa (Boheman, 1854)
- Acromis spinifex (Linnaeus, 1763)
- Acromis venosa Erichson, 1847
