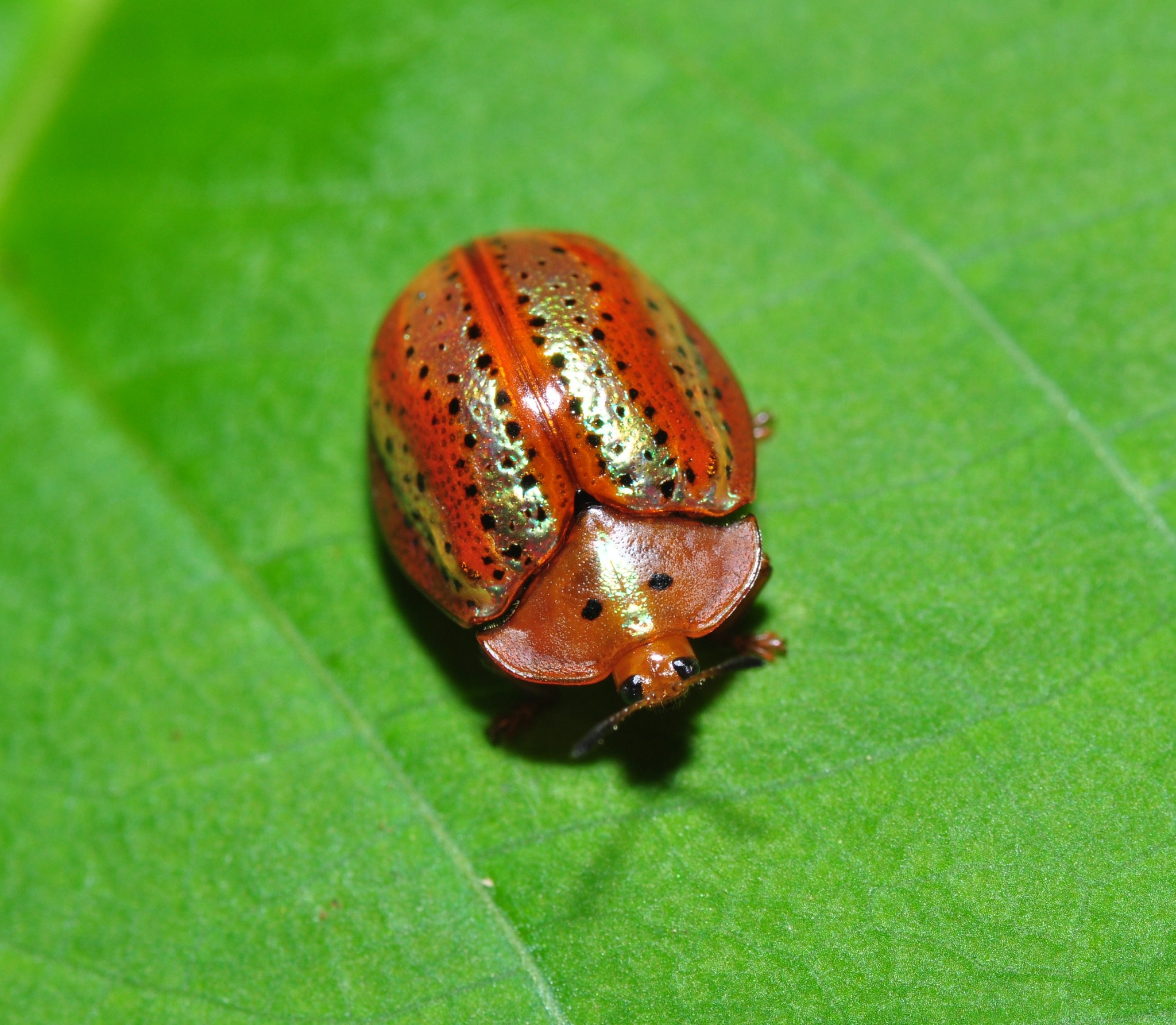
- A metallic neotropical tortoise beetle on a leaf

Scientific classification
- Kingdom: Animalia
- Phylum: Arthropoda
- Clade: Pancrustacea
- Class: Insecta
- Order: Coleoptera
- Suborder: Polyphaga
- Infraorder: Cucujiformia
- Family: Chrysomelidae
- Genus: Chelymorpha
- Species: C. alternans

Binomial name
- Chelymorpha alternans Boheman, 1854

= Chelymorpha alternans =

Species of beetles

Chelymorpha alternans, the neotropical tortoise beetle, is a species of leaf beetle in the family Chrysomelidae and the Cassidinae subfamily. Its name is derived from its body shape and patterning. The first half of its name, Chelymorpha, means 'turtle/tortoise form' while the second part, alternans, means 'alternating'.

C. alternans is best known for demonstrating color polymorphism on its pronotum and elytra; these polymorphisms can vary from individual to individual. There are five different phenotypes which often leads to misidentification with a close beetle relative, Chelymorpha cribraria.

== Description ==
Female adult neotropical tortoise beetles are usually around 11–12 mm in length and 4–5 mm in width. Males tend to be smaller and more circular than females, usually around 5–8 mm in length and 3–5 mm in width. In terms of larvae, 1st instar larvae are approximately 2 mm in length, growing an average of 1 mm until the 3rd instar. Finally, 4th and 5th larvae develop to their final pupae length of 12–13 mm. These beetles are able to fly short distances (10–20 m), but are rarely seen doing so as their wings are mostly for motor function, such as turning themselves over.

== Color polymorphism ==
The neotropical tortoise beetle demonstrates five different color polymorphism leading to five different phenotypes. Beetles with the "rufipennis" phenotype have a black pronotum and red elytra. The "veraguensis" phenotype beetles demonstrate a red pronotum and red elytra. The "metallic" phenotype beetles have a metallic yellow and red striped pronotum and elytra. Finally, the "Darien" phenotype is split into "Militaris-a" and "Militaris-b". "Militaris-a" beetles have a black and red striped pronotum and elytra, meanwhile the "militaris-b" beetles demonstrates a black pronotum and a black and red striped elytra. Although 12 phenotypes are theoretically possible, only these 4 ("militaris" phenotypes counted as one) have been demonstrated in both a field and laboratory setting.

Although color polymorphism gives each beetle phenotype distinctly unique color patterns, there is no evidence that shows that this leads to disassortative mating amongst the beetles, or that beetles show any sort of preferential selection towards beetles of a similar color. Mating has been demonstrated to be completely random.

== Habitat ==
Early studies of Chelymorpha alternans show that the beetle was originally documented to be found throughout Central America, South America and parts of the Caribbean in countries such as Costa Rica, Panama, Colombia, Brazil, Dominican Republic, and Venezuela. More recent studies confirm distribution of the beetle from western Costa Rica to the Darien province of Panama. Due to misidentification of the beetle, often confused with its close relative, Chelymorpha cribaria, the distribution of the Neotropical leaf beetle in South America is unresolved and still being studied.

The Neotropical tortoise beetle has been found to inhabit a range of elevations from sea level to 1000 meters. The beetle prefers light-rich zones and has often been found in forest gaps and edge habitats such as the sides of roads, rivers, and pastures, as this is where its host plants are found in abundance. Different color phenotypes of the neotropical tortoise beetle have also been shown to have different distributions across habitats as well, specifically in Panama. The "veraguensis" phenotype, characterized by red elytra and red pronotum, are more commonly found on the Western side of the Panamanian Isthmus while the "militaris" phenotypes, which are red and black, are often found on the east side of the Panama Canal. Additionally, the "metallic" phenotype is the most widely distributed phenotype of the beetle, as it is the most commonly found phenotypic variant across various sites.

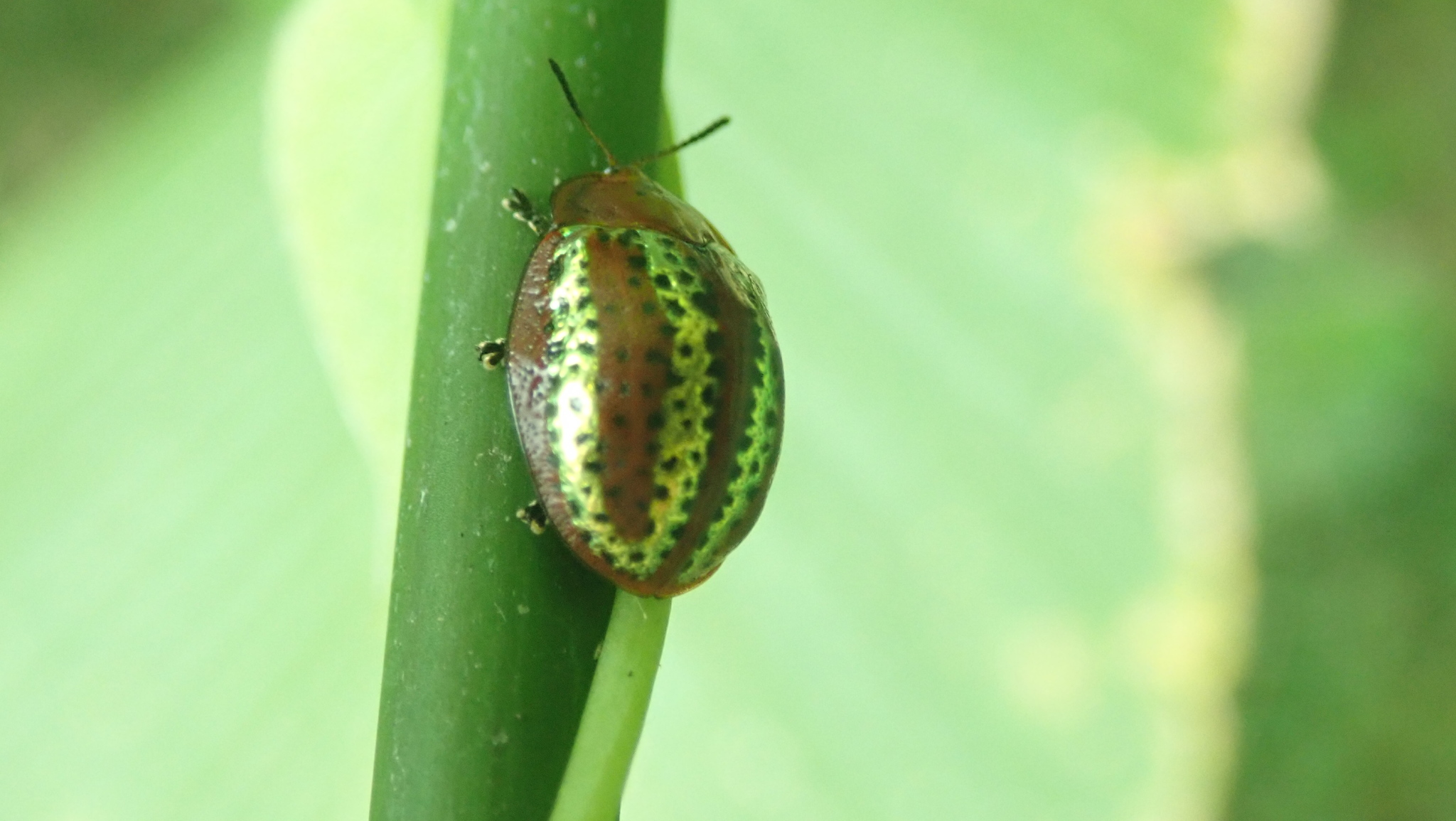
Metallic phenotypic C. alternans perched on a leaf stem.

== Diet ==
The neotropical tortoise beetle is an oligophagous herbivore, consuming the native host plants that it lives on. The beetle possesses a wider-ranging diet than other closely related beetles in the Cassidinae family as experimentally, the beetle has also been observed consuming several nonnative host plants such as Ipomoea batatas (L.) Lamand, Ipomoea nil (L.) Roth, Ipomoea tricolor Cav., and Convolvulus arvensis L.

=== Larvae diet changes ===
Young larvae do not consume leaf veins and instead consume leaf mesophyll close to the egg mass. Larvae also tend to consume leaves in a group early in their development, systematically eating leafs one at a time, but this behavior seems to dissipate as the larvae matures past the 3rd instar stage. Once the larvae pass the 3rd instar stage, they will begin to also consume leaf veins. As they prepare for metamorphosis, host plant consumption will reduce until it completely stops one day prior to pupation, as the larvae position themselves in preparation for the next stage of their life cycle.

== Mating ==
Neotropical tortoise beetles reach sexual maturation after 2 to 3 weeks. Females tend to mate once in their lifetime but are able to produce egg masses after their first copulation until their death.

=== Copulatory courtship ===
During copulation, four major movements are observed in the beetle including soft pumping of the aedagus, swaying of the female's elytra, body jerking and vibration of the head. These movements are performed at various intervals throughout copulation. Sperm transfer from the male to the female occur during the soft pumping of the aedagus. Copulation in the beetles can occur for approximately 45 minutes to 3 hours. Although neotropical tortoise beetles do demonstrate pre-copulatory courtship, they do not exhibit any postcopulatory courtship and, upon retracting the aedagus, dismount the female and walk away. After copulation, females can expel a droplet from their genitals that contains spermatozoa. This behavior is seen much more in virgin females and is related to female sexual selection.

=== Sexual selection ===
Neotropical tortoise beetles demonstrate sexual selection, as there tends to be a sexually selected advantage for flagellum length in males. Females tend to have a rigid, curvy spermathecal duct that is difficult to reach. Additionally, contraction and relaxation of the duct can inhibit the uptake of sperm by the female. Due to the length of the spermathecal duct in female neotropical tortoise beetles, male beetles have developed extensive flagellum that can be up to three times the body length of the male. This can be attributed to the fact that male flagellum length is directly correlated with male reproductive success. Therefore, females tend to select for those males that have longer flagella and these longer flagella are also naturally selected for due to them increasing the success of mating for males. Flagella length is not selected against as when it reaches the ampulla, it becomes trapped and the flagellum coils on itself to maintain proper location to ensure mating success, allowing runaway selection for flagellum length.

== Mutualism ==
Neotropical tortoise beetle pupae face the dangers of predation by other insects including ants, such as weaver ants (Camponotus senex) and Azteca ants. During metamorphosis, F.oxysporum fungus coats the beetles thoroughly, protecting them against predators. Research has shown that larvae without this coating were much less likely to survive against predators than those who were coated by the fungus. In exchange for this protection, beetles serve as a vessel for spreading the fungus to its host plants. As they oftentimes carry the fungus on their legs, the fungus follows them to their host plants ultimately infecting the plant. This infection leads to wilt disease in the plant, inducing the death of the host plant. Overall, this life-long symbiotic relationship is beneficial for the beetle as it protects the survivability of their offspring, but it is also important to the spread of the fungus, as without the beetle, the fungus exhibits great difficulty in infecting plants.
