= Zatrephina =

Scientific classification
- Kingdom: Animalia
- Phylum: Arthropoda
- Clade: Pancrustacea
- Class: Insecta
- Order: Coleoptera
- Suborder: Polyphaga
- Infraorder: Cucujiformia
- Family: Chrysomelidae
- Subfamily: Cassidinae
- Tribe: Mesomphaliini
- Genus: Zatrephina; Spaeth, 1909

Genus of leaf beetles

Zatrephina is a genus of leaf beetles of the family Chrysomelidae.

== Species ==
- Zatrephina atrorubra (Guérin-Méneville, 1844)
- Zatrephina lineata (Fabricius, 1787)
- Zatrephina princeps (Boheman, 1854)
- Zatrephina sexlunata (Klug, 1829)
