= Omaspides pallidipennis =

Scientific classification
- Kingdom: Animalia
- Phylum: Arthropoda
- Clade: Pancrustacea
- Class: Insecta
- Order: Coleoptera
- Suborder: Polyphaga
- Infraorder: Cucujiformia
- Family: Chrysomelidae
- Genus: Omaspides
- Species: O. pallidipennis

Binomial name
- Omaspides pallidipennis (Boheman, 1854)

Synonyms
- Omoplata pallidipennis Boheman, 1854; Omoplata sublucida Boheman, 1854

Species of beetle

Omaspides pallidipennis is a species of beetle of the family Chrysomelidae. It is found in Brazil (Espírito Santo, Goiás, Pernambuco, Rio Grande do Sul, Minas Gerais, Paraná, Rio de Janeiro, Santa Catarina, São Paulo).

== Life history ==
The recorded host plant is Ipomoea alba.
