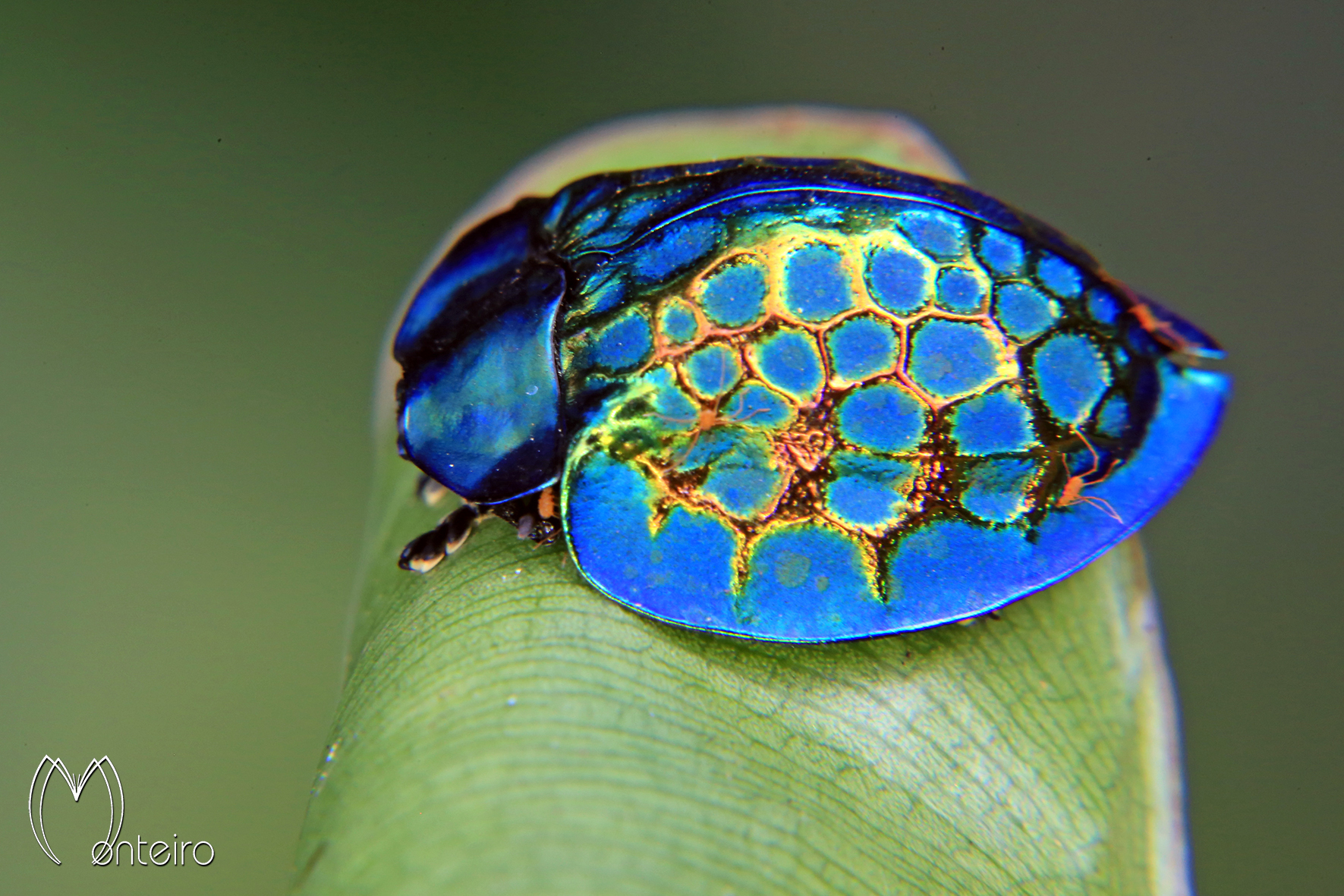

Scientific classification
- Kingdom: Animalia
- Phylum: Arthropoda
- Clade: Pancrustacea
- Class: Insecta
- Order: Coleoptera
- Suborder: Polyphaga
- Infraorder: Cucujiformia
- Family: Chrysomelidae
- Genus: Stolas
- Species: S. imperialis

Binomial name
- Stolas imperialis (Spath, 1898)

= Stolas imperialis =

Species of beetle

Stolas imperialis, the imperial tortoise beetle, is a species of beetle found in Brazil.
