= Xenicomorpha =

Scientific classification
- Kingdom: Animalia
- Phylum: Arthropoda
- Clade: Pancrustacea
- Class: Insecta
- Order: Coleoptera
- Suborder: Polyphaga
- Infraorder: Cucujiformia
- Family: Chrysomelidae
- Subfamily: Cassidinae
- Tribe: Mesomphaliini
- Genus: Xenicomorpha; Spaeth, 1913
- Species: X. scapularis

Binomial name
- Xenicomorpha scapularis (Boheman, 1854)

Synonyms
- Omoplata scapularis Boheman, 1854

Genus of beetle

Xenicomorpha is a genus of beetle belonging to the leaf beetle family, Chrysomelidae, containing a single species, X. scapularis. Both the larvae and the adults (imago) are herbivores.

== Description ==
A middle-sized, oval, brown-gold (at least on dead examples) tortoise beetle. The front corner covers are not prominent. The head is visible from above, the antennae about the same length as the pronotums. The pronotum is rounded trapezoidal, somewhat narrower than the cover wings, not forming a continuous curve with them. The covers are pointed at the back, the surface fine but tight and heavily punctured. The legs are fairly short.

== Ecology ==
The species lives on plants from the family Convolvulaceae.

== Distribution ==
The species is known from Peru and Bolivia.
