= Stolas suturalis =

Scientific classification
- Kingdom: Animalia
- Phylum: Arthropoda
- Clade: Pancrustacea
- Class: Insecta
- Order: Coleoptera
- Suborder: Polyphaga
- Infraorder: Cucujiformia
- Family: Chrysomelidae
- Genus: Stolas
- Species: S. suturalis

Binomial name
- Stolas suturalis (Fabricius, 1777)

Synonyms
- Cassida suturalis Fabricius, 1777

Species of beetle

Stolas suturalis is a species of beetle of the family Chrysomelidae. It is found in Brazil (Bahia, Pará, Pernambuco) and French Guiana.
