= Stolas brachiata =

Scientific classification
- Kingdom: Animalia
- Phylum: Arthropoda
- Clade: Pancrustacea
- Class: Insecta
- Order: Coleoptera
- Suborder: Polyphaga
- Infraorder: Cucujiformia
- Family: Chrysomelidae
- Genus: Stolas
- Species: S. brachiata

Binomial name
- Stolas brachiata (Fabricius, 1798)

Synonyms
- Cassida brachiata Fabricius, 1798; Mesomphalia brachiata var. transversalis Boheman, 1850; Mesomphalia brachiata ab. margineguttata Boheman, 1850; Cassida quadrinotata Herbst, 1799; Mesomphalia misella Boheman, 1850

Species of beetle

Stolas brachiata is a species of beetle of the family Chrysomelidae. It is found in Brazil (Bahia, Pará, Rio de Janeiro, Pernambuco), French Guiana, Guyana, Paraguay, Suriname, Trinidad and Venezuela.

== Life history ==
The recorded host plant is Ipomoea batatas.
