= Botanochara =

Scientific classification
- Kingdom: Animalia
- Phylum: Arthropoda
- Clade: Pancrustacea
- Class: Insecta
- Order: Coleoptera
- Suborder: Polyphaga
- Infraorder: Cucujiformia
- Family: Chrysomelidae
- Subfamily: Cassidinae
- Tribe: Mesomphaliini
- Genus: Botanochara; Dejean, 1836

Synonyms
- Epichorestes Gistel, 1848; Poecilaspis Hope, 1840

Genus of leaf beetles

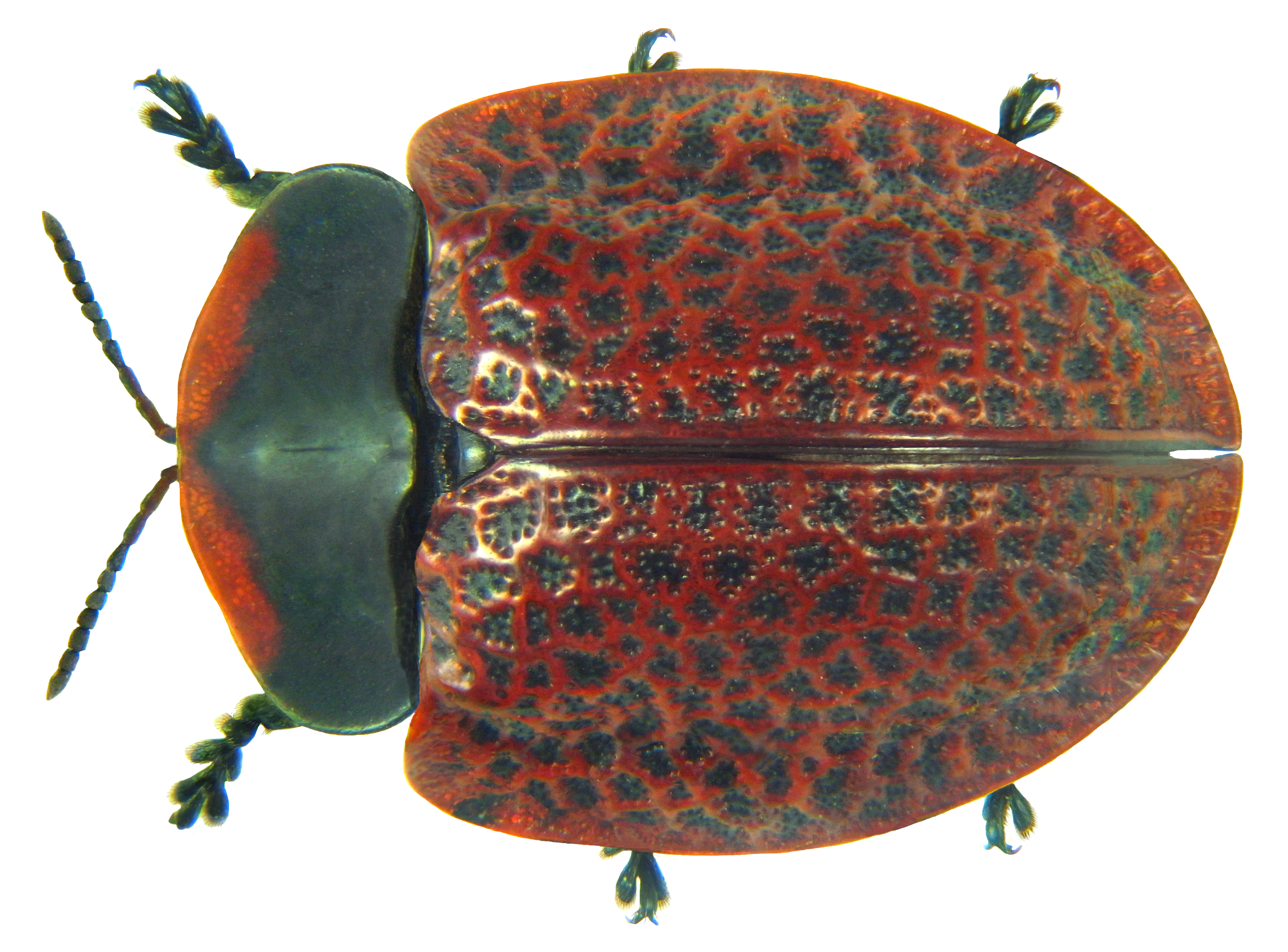
Botanochara impressa (Panzer, 1798)

Botanochara is a genus of leaf beetles of the family Chrysomelidae.

== Species ==
- Botanochara angulata (Germar, 1824)
- Botanochara boggianii (Spaeth, 1900)
- Botanochara boliviaca (Spaeth, 1926)
- Botanochara bonariensis (Boheman, 1850)
- Botanochara cancellata (Boheman, 1850)
- Botanochara convexiuscula (Spaeth, 1922)
- Botanochara decemnotata (Boheman, 1850)
- Botanochara decempustulata (Boheman, 1850)
- Botanochara decemverrucata (Boheman, 1850)
- Botanochara duodecimnotata (Boheman, 1850)
- Botanochara duodecimverrucata (Boheman, 1850)
- Botanochara encausta (Boheman, 1850)
- Botanochara fastidita (Boheman, 1850)
- Botanochara guttipennis (Spaeth, 1915)
- Botanochara haematodes (Perty, 1834)
- Botanochara impressa (Panzer, 1798)
- Botanochara impressipennis (Boheman, 1850)
- Botanochara intricata (Boheman, 1850)
- Botanochara invasa (Boheman, 1850)
- Botanochara lurida (Spaeth, 1940)
- Botanochara macularia (Boheman, 1850)
- Botanochara miniata (Baly, 1887)
- Botanochara missionea (Boheman, 1850)
- Botanochara nigropicta (Boheman, 1850)
- Botanochara octoplagiata (Spaeth, 1909)
- Botanochara octopustulata (Klug, 1829)
- Botanochara ordinata (Boheman, 1850)
- Botanochara ornata (Boheman, 1850)
- Botanochara pantherina (Klug, 1829)
- Botanochara pavonia (Boheman, 1850)
- Botanochara planipennis (Spaeth, 1899)
- Botanochara praefica (Spaeth, 1940)
- Botanochara quinquefasciata (Perty, 1834)
- Botanochara regina (Boheman, 1862)
- Botanochara ricardoi (Buzzi, 1998)
- Botanochara rubroguttata (Boheman, 1850)
- Botanochara ruforeticulata (Boheman, 1850)
- Botanochara sanguinea (Spaeth, 1909)
- Botanochara sedecimpustulata (Fabricius, 1801)
- Botanochara segnis (Boheman, 1862)
- Botanochara sigillata (Spaeth, 1940)
- Botanochara subnervosa (Boheman, 1850)
- Botanochara tesselata (Burmeister, 1870)
- Botanochara vianai Borowiec, 1989
