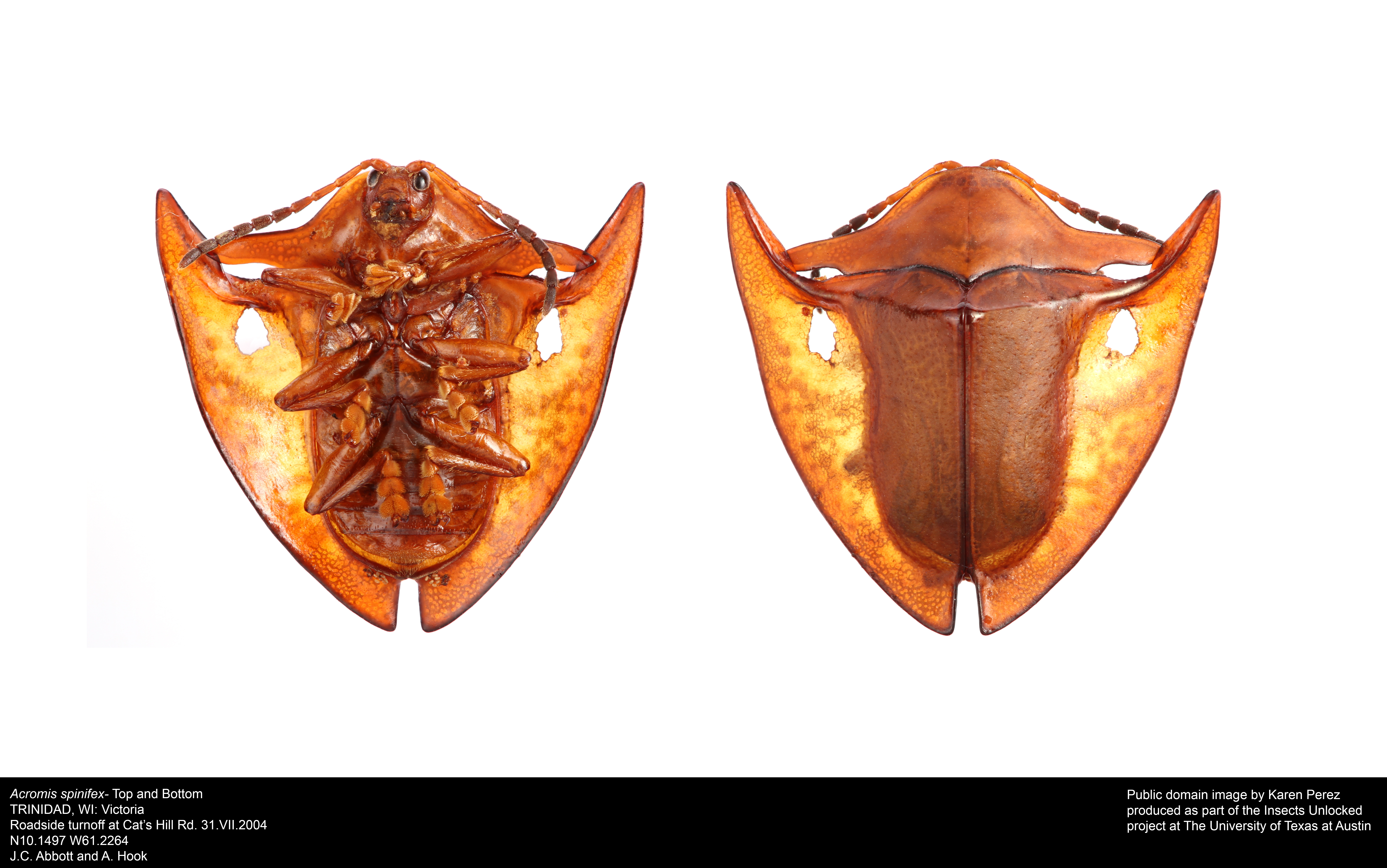
- Public domain image of Acromis spinifex by Karen Perez produced as part of the Insects Unlocked project at the University of Texas at Austin

Scientific classification
- Kingdom: Animalia
- Phylum: Arthropoda
- Clade: Pancrustacea
- Class: Insecta
- Order: Coleoptera
- Suborder: Polyphaga
- Infraorder: Cucujiformia
- Family: Chrysomelidae
- Genus: Acromis
- Species: A. spinifex

Binomial name
- Acromis spinifex (Linnaeus, 1763)

Synonyms
- Cassida spinifex Linnaeus, 1763; Selenis spinifex (Linnaeus, 1763); Acromis spinifex (Linnaeus, 1763); Cassida angustata Linnaeus, 1767; Selenis spinifex var. angustata (Linnaeus, 1767); Cassida perforata Pallas, 1772; Selenis perforata (Pallas, 1772); Selenis spinifex ab. perforata (Pallas, 1772); Selenis nebulosa Boheman, 1854; Selenis spinifex ab. nebulosa (Boheman, 1854); Acromis nebulosa (Boheman, 1854)

= Acromis spinifex =

Species of beetle

Acromis spinifex is a species of tortoise beetle from South America. The males have enlarged elytra which are probably used in male–male combat, while females are among the few tortoise beetles to show maternal care of their offspring.

== Distribution ==
Acromis spinifex is found across South America, from Trinidad and Tobago and Venezuela in the north to Peru, northern Argentina and Paraguay in the south.

== Description ==
As with other species in the genus Acromis, A. spinifex shows conspicuous sexual dimorphism. The elytra of males extend sideways and forwards to form flattened plates. Other species in the genus have been studied more closely, and they have been observed to engage in male–male combat, in which the flattened parts of the elytra are often pierced; such holes are frequently found in museum specimens of Acromis.

Males are 10.9–12.7 millimetres (0.43–0.50 in) long and 8.7–10.8 mm (0.34–0.43 in) wide, while females are slightly smaller, 9.7–11.4 mm (0.38–0.45 in) long and 8.3–11.6 mm (0.33–0.46 in) wide.

== Ecology and life cycle ==
The host plants of Acromis spinifex are plants in the family Convolvulaceae, typically Ipomoea species such as the sweet potato, Ipomoea batatas. Predators of A. spinifex include the shield bugs Stiretrus smaragdatus and S. decastigma.

Acromis spinifex is unusual among tortoise beetles in that it practises parental care of its offspring. All stages of the young beetle are guarded by the female, from the egg to the pupa. The female lays a mass of 15 white, oblong eggs, which are glued together and attached to the midrib of a leaf of the host plant. Each egg is 1.4–1.6 mm (0.055–0.063 in) long by 0.7–0.8 mm (0.028–0.031 in) wide. The final larval instar is 4.8–6.6 mm (0.19–0.26 in) long, and yellowish, with a brown head and brown legs. Reports of paternal care derive from an illustration published in 1939 which wrongly showed a male guarding eggs.

== Taxonomic history ==
Acromis spinifex was first described by Carl Linnaeus in his 1763 work Centuria Insectorum, under the name Cassida spinifex. In 1837, it was made the type species of the new genus Acromis by Louis Chevrolat. One lectotype and one paralectotype were designated in 1999 and are deposited in the Naturhistoriska Riksmuseet in Stockholm, Sweden.
