= Cyrtonota cyanea =

Scientific classification
- Kingdom: Animalia
- Phylum: Arthropoda
- Clade: Pancrustacea
- Class: Insecta
- Order: Coleoptera
- Suborder: Polyphaga
- Infraorder: Cucujiformia
- Family: Chrysomelidae
- Genus: Cyrtonota
- Species: C. cyanea

Binomial name
- Cyrtonota cyanea (Linnaeus, 1758)

Synonyms
- Cassida cyanea Linnaeus, 1758

Species of beetle

Cyrtonota cyanea is a species of beetle of the family Chrysomelidae. It is found in Brazil (Pernambuco, Rio de Janeiro, Santa Catarina, São Paulo).

== Life history ==
The recorded host plant is Ipomoea batatas.
