= Chelymorpha wollastoni =

Scientific classification
- Kingdom: Animalia
- Phylum: Arthropoda
- Clade: Pancrustacea
- Class: Insecta
- Order: Coleoptera
- Suborder: Polyphaga
- Infraorder: Cucujiformia
- Family: Chrysomelidae
- Genus: Chelymorpha
- Species: C. wollastoni

Binomial name
- Chelymorpha wollastoni Boheman, 1854

Species of beetle

Chelymorpha wollastoni is a species of beetle of the family Chrysomelidae. It is found in Brazil (Pernambuco) and Suriname.
