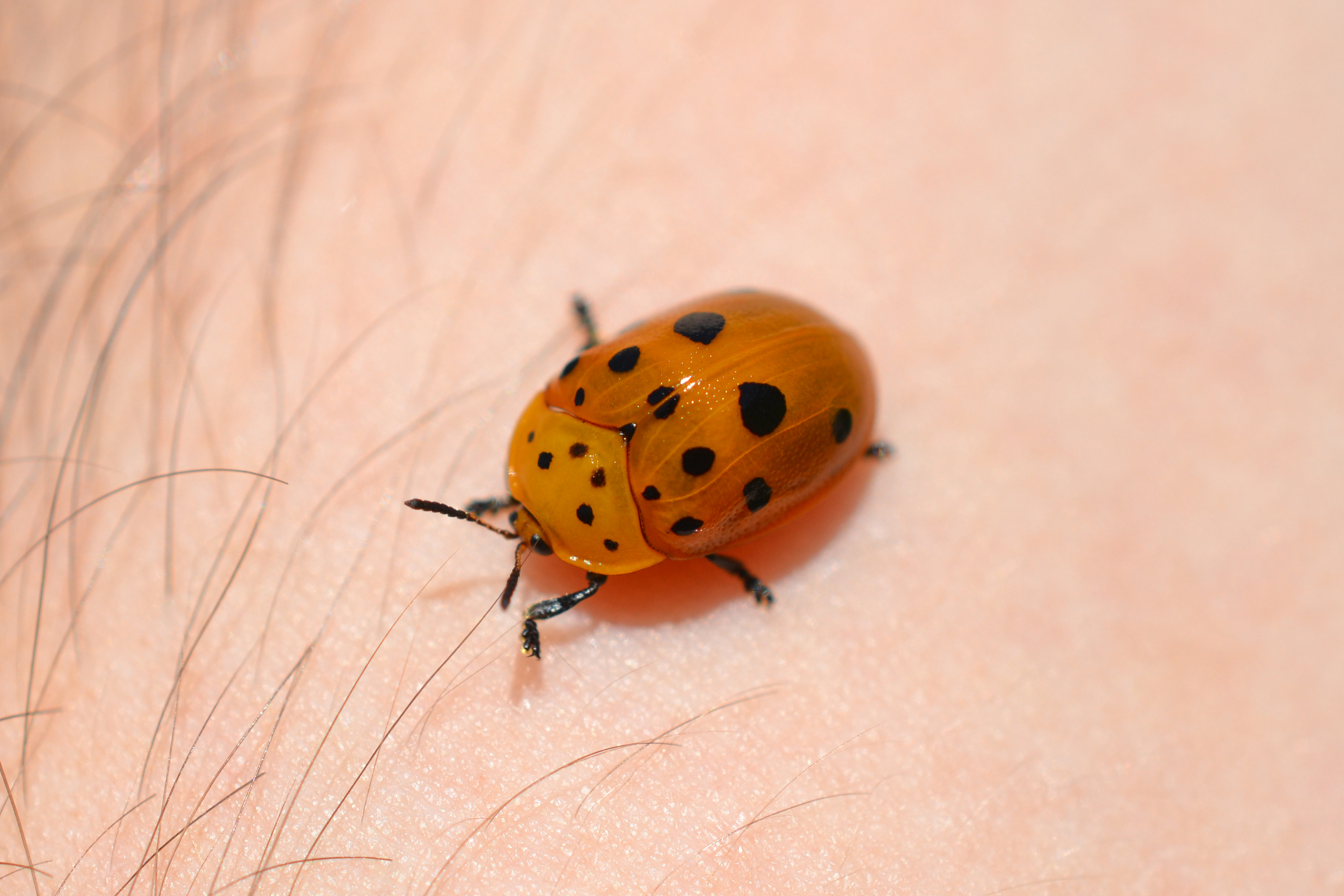
- Chelymorpha cassidea

Scientific classification
- Kingdom: Animalia
- Phylum: Arthropoda
- Clade: Pancrustacea
- Class: Insecta
- Order: Coleoptera
- Suborder: Polyphaga
- Infraorder: Cucujiformia
- Family: Chrysomelidae
- Subfamily: Cassidinae
- Tribe: Mesomphaliini
- Genus: Chelymorpha; Chevrolat in Dejean, 1836

= Chelymorpha =

Genus of beetles

Chelymorpha is a genus of tortoise beetles and hispines in the family Chrysomelidae, found mostly in the Americas, but also with records from southern Europe. There are more than 70 described species in Chelymorpha.

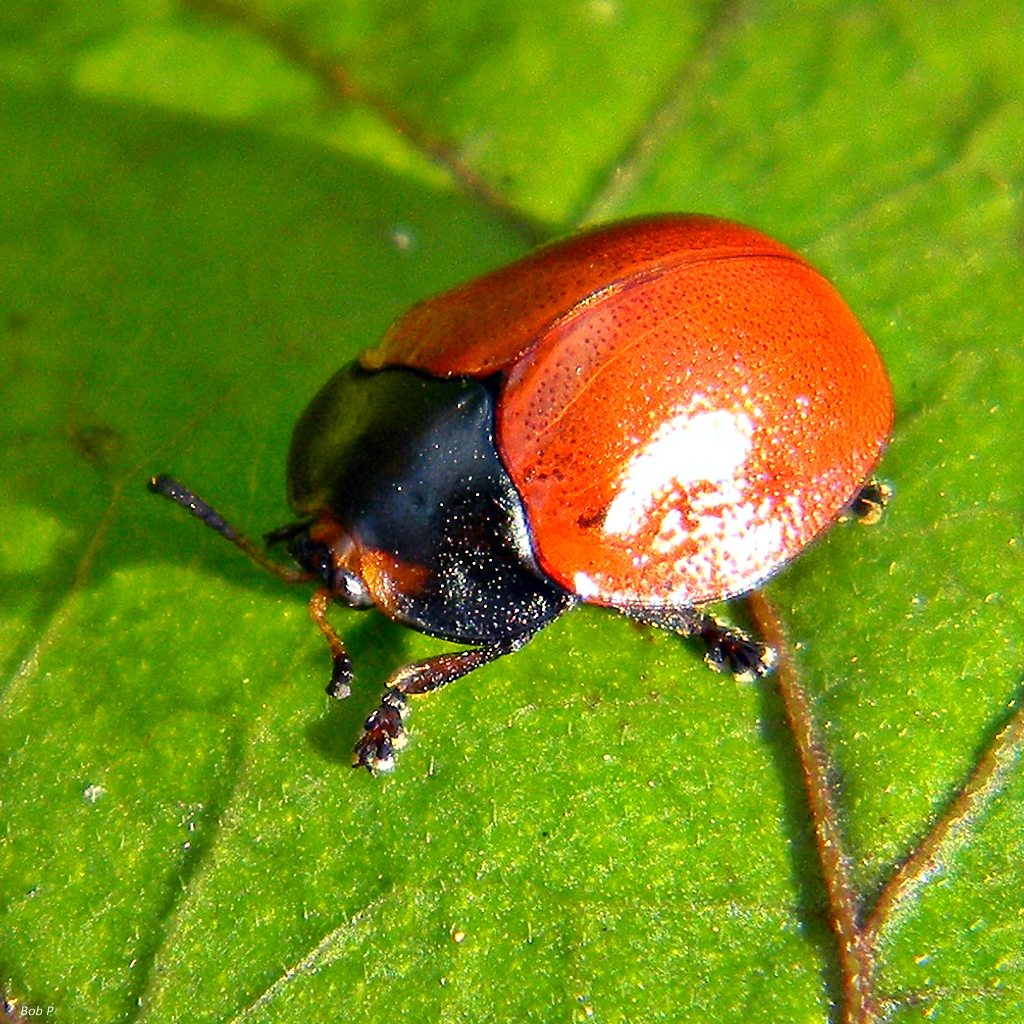
Chelymorpha cribraria

== Species ==
These 71 species belong to the genus Chelymorpha:

- Chelymorpha aculeata Borowiec, 2000
- Chelymorpha adnata (Boheman, 1854)
- Chelymorpha adspersula Boheman, 1862
- Chelymorpha advena Boheman, 1856
- Chelymorpha alternans Boheman, 1854
- Chelymorpha andicola Spaeth, 1928
- Chelymorpha areata (Erichson, 1847)
- Chelymorpha atomaria Boheman, 1854
- Chelymorpha atrocincta Spaeth, 1926
- Chelymorpha binotata (Fabricius, 1792)
- Chelymorpha bituberculata (Fabricius, 1787)
- Chelymorpha bivulnerata Spaeth, 1909
- Chelymorpha boliviana Boheman, 1854
- Chelymorpha bullata Boheman, 1854
- Chelymorpha calva Boheman, 1854
- Chelymorpha cassidea (Fabricius, 1775) (Argus tortoise beetle)
- Chelymorpha cavata Boheman, 1854
- Chelymorpha cingulata Boheman, 1854
- Chelymorpha circumpunctata (Klug, 1829)
- Chelymorpha clathrata Spaeth, 1909
- Chelymorpha clivosa Boheman, 1854
- Chelymorpha cobaltina Boheman, 1854
- Chelymorpha comata Boheman, 1854
- Chelymorpha commutabilis Boheman, 1854
- Chelymorpha constellata (Klug, 1829)
- Chelymorpha costaricensis (Spaeth, 1922)
- Chelymorpha cribraria (Fabricius, 1775)
- Chelymorpha gressoria Boheman, 1862
- Chelymorpha haematura Boheman, 1854
- Chelymorpha hoepfneri Boheman, 1854
- Chelymorpha indigesta Boheman, 1854
- Chelymorpha infecta Boheman, 1854
- Chelymorpha infirma Boheman, 1854
- Chelymorpha inflata Boheman, 1854
- Chelymorpha insignis (Klug, 1829)
- Chelymorpha klugii Boheman, 1854
- Chelymorpha limbatipennis Spaeth, 1926
- Chelymorpha marginata (Linnaeus, 1758)
- Chelymorpha militaris Boheman, 1862
- Chelymorpha multipicta Boheman, 1862
- Chelymorpha multipunctata Olivier, 1790
- Chelymorpha nigricollis Boheman, 1854
- Chelymorpha orthogonia Boheman, 1854
- Chelymorpha pacifica Boheman, 1854
- Chelymorpha partita Boheman, 1854
- Chelymorpha peregrina Boheman, 1854
- Chelymorpha personata Boheman, 1854
- Chelymorpha peruana Spaeth, 1902
- Chelymorpha phytophagica Crotch, 1873
- Chelymorpha polyspilota Burmeister, 1870
- Chelymorpha praetextata Boheman, 1854
- Chelymorpha pubescens Boheman, 1854
- Chelymorpha punctatissima Spaeth, 1937
- Chelymorpha punctigera Boheman, 1854
- Chelymorpha reimoseri Spaeth, 1928
- Chelymorpha rosarioensis Buzzi, 2000
- Chelymorpha rufoguttata Spaeth, 1909
- Chelymorpha rugicollis Champion, 1893
- Chelymorpha sericea Boheman, 1862
- Chelymorpha socia Boheman, 1854
- Chelymorpha sturmii Boheman, 1854
- Chelymorpha stygia Boheman, 1862
- Chelymorpha subpunctata Boheman, 1854
- Chelymorpha tessellata Spaeth, 1928
- Chelymorpha texta Boheman, 1862
- Chelymorpha trinitatis Spaeth, 1926
- Chelymorpha varians (Blanchard, 1851)
- Chelymorpha variolosa (Olivier, 1790)
- Chelymorpha vermiculata Boheman, 1854
- Chelymorpha vittifera (Spaeth, 1932)
- Chelymorpha wollastoni Boheman, 1854
