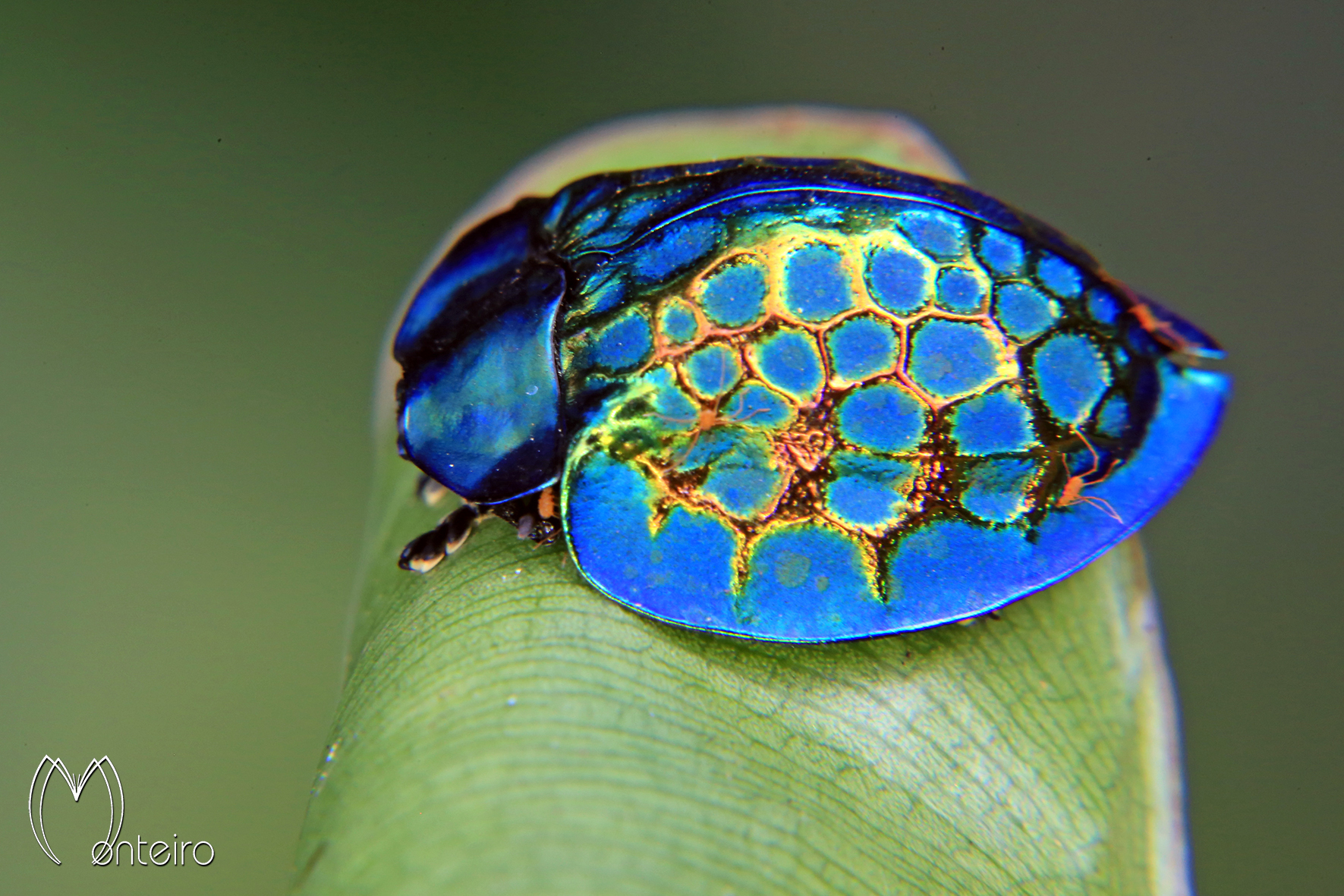
- Stolas imperialis

Scientific classification
- Kingdom: Animalia
- Phylum: Arthropoda
- Clade: Pancrustacea
- Class: Insecta
- Order: Coleoptera
- Suborder: Polyphaga
- Infraorder: Cucujiformia
- Family: Chrysomelidae
- Subfamily: Cassidinae
- Tribe: Mesomphaliini
- Genus: Stolas; Billberg, 1820

= Stolas (beetle) =

Genus of beetles

Stolas is a genus of leaf beetles, sometimes called tortoise beetles. They are found mostly in South America, Central America, and Caribbean Islands, with some records from eastern and southern Europe.

== Species ==
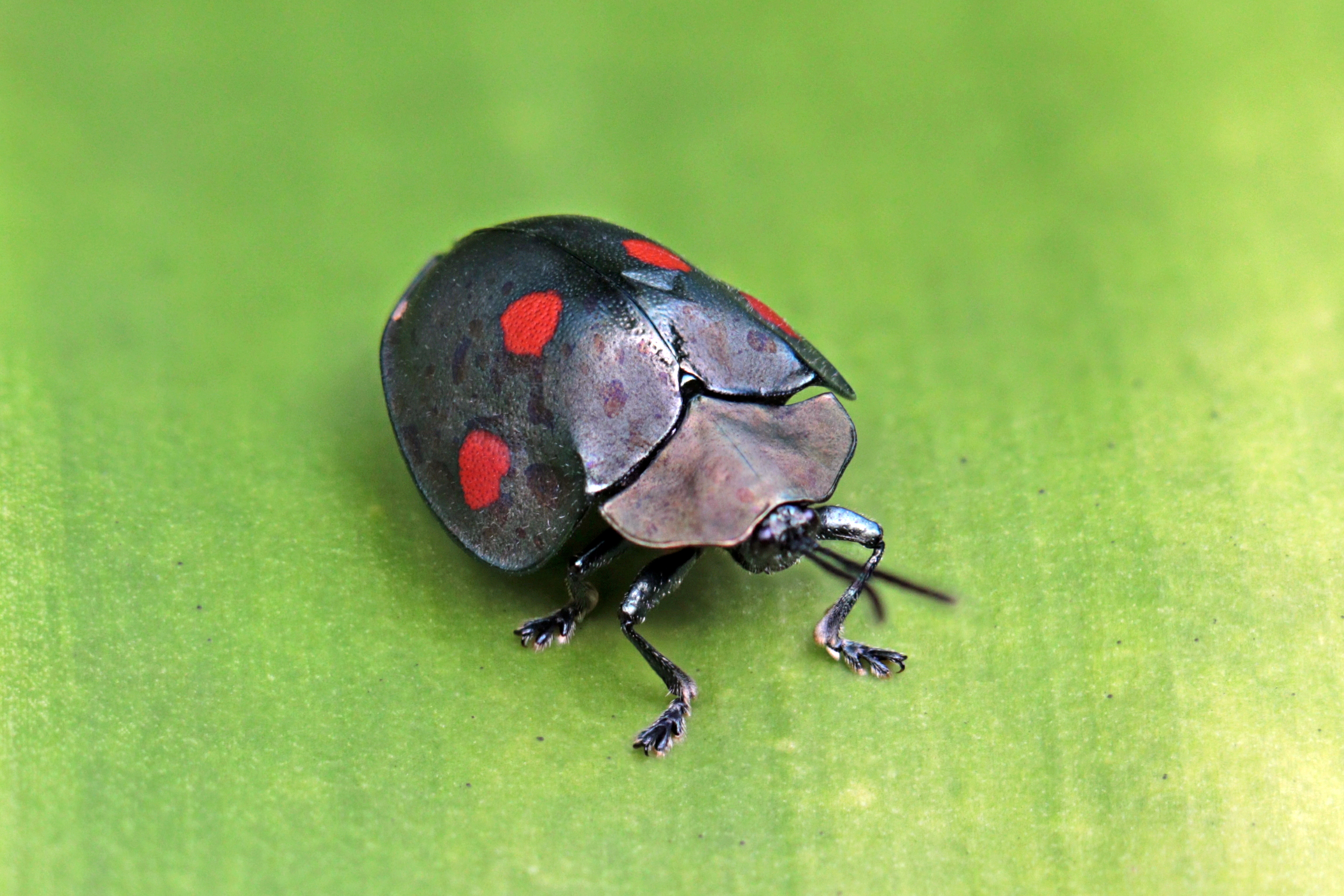
Stolas lebasii, Panama

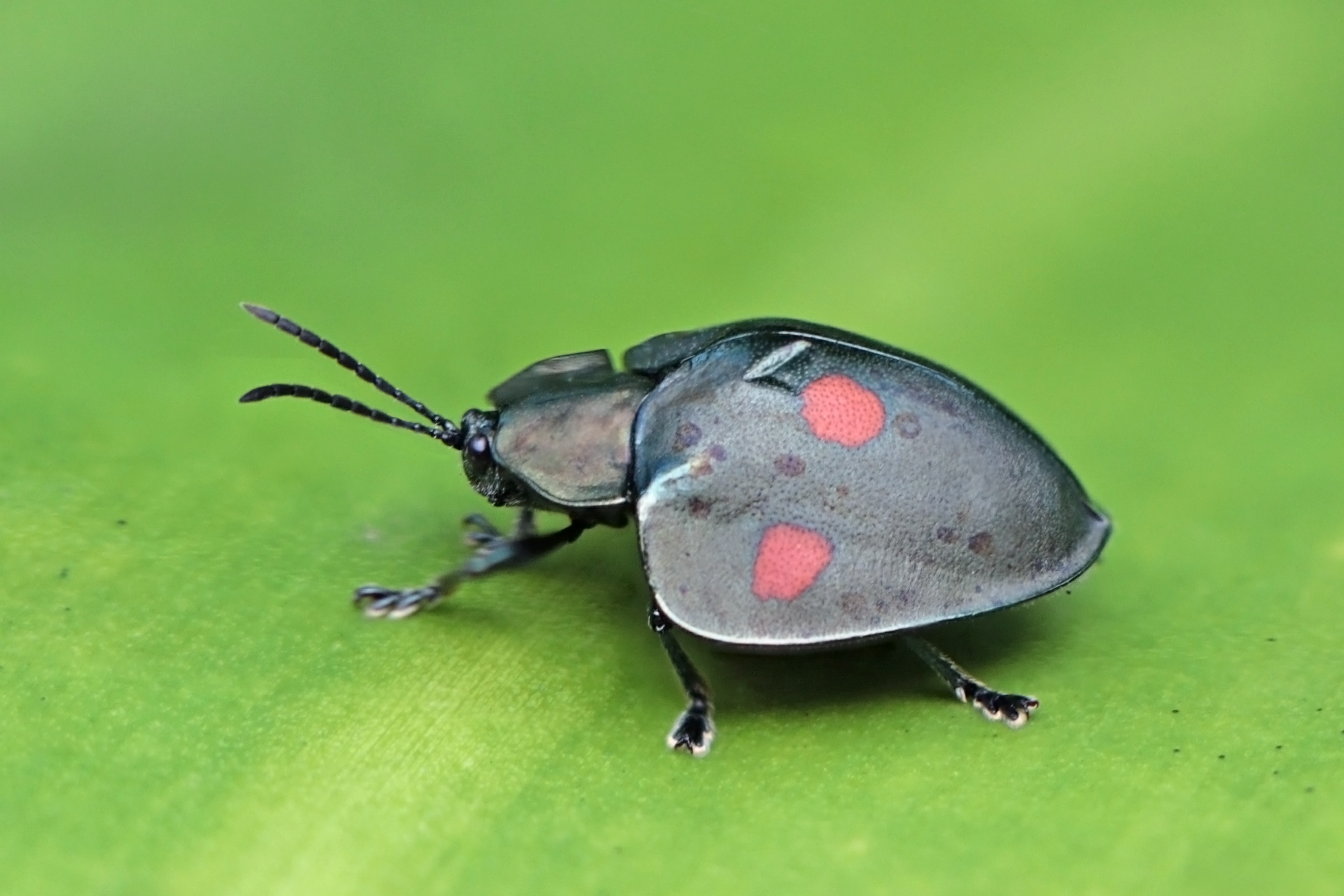
Stolas lebasii, Panama

Species in the genus include:

1. Stolas acuminata (Boheman, 1850)
2. Stolas acuta (Boheman, 1850)
3. Stolas aenea (Olivier, 1790)
4. Stolas aeneovittata (Champion, 1893)
5. Stolas agenysiformis Borowiec, 2011
6. Stolas alcyonea (Spaeth, 1911)
7. Stolas amoena (Spaeth, 1917)
8. Stolas anceps (Boheman, 1850)
9. Stolas antiqua (Sahlberg, 1823)
10. Stolas areolata (Germar, 1824)
11. Stolas armirantensis Borowiec, 1999
12. Stolas arrowi (Spaeth, 1932)
13. Stolas arula (Boheman, 1862)
14. Stolas asema (Boheman, 1862)
15. Stolas atalayaensis Borowiec and Takizawa, 2011
16. Stolas augur (Boheman, 1856)
17. Stolas beatula (Boheman, 1862)
18. Stolas bilineata (Boheman, 1850)
19. Stolas bioculata (Boheman, 1850)
20. Stolas blanda (Boheman, 1850)
21. Stolas blandifica (Boheman, 1862)
22. Stolas boliviana (Spaeth, 1909)
23. Stolas brachiata (Fabricius, 1798)
24. Stolas brevicuspis (Spaeth, 1922)
25. Stolas brunni (Spaeth, 1905)
26. Stolas callizona (Spaeth, 1909)
27. Stolas calvata (Boheman, 1862)
28. Stolas cassandra (Spaeth, 1911)
29. Stolas castigata (Boheman, 1856)
30. Stolas chalybaea (Germar, 1824)
31. Stolas chelidonaria (De Mey, 1838)
32. Stolas clathrata (Spaeth, 1902)
33. Stolas coalita (Boheman, 1862)
34. Stolas coerulescens (Boheman, 1850)
35. Stolas comis (Spaeth, 1912)
36. Stolas confusa (Boheman, 1850)
37. Stolas consanguinea (Kirsch, 1876)
38. Stolas consociata (Baly, 1872)
39. Stolas conspersa (Germar, 1824)
40. Stolas contubernalis (Boheman, 1856)
41. Stolas cordata (Wagener, 1881)
42. Stolas corruptiva (Spaeth, 1911)
43. Stolas croceovittata (Spaeth, 1901)
44. Stolas cruentata (Erichson, 1847)
45. Stolas cucullata (Boheman, 1862)
46. Stolas decemguttata (Sturm, 1828)
47. Stolas deleta (Boheman, 1850)
48. Stolas demissa (Boheman, 1856)
49. Stolas deplorabunda (Boheman, 1856)
50. Stolas discoides (Linnaeus, 1758)
51. Stolas diversa (Boheman, 1850)
52. Stolas duricoria (Boheman, 1862)
53. Stolas echoma Borowiec, 1998
54. Stolas ephippium (Lichtenstein, 1795)
55. Stolas erectepilosa Borowiec, 1998
56. Stolas erichsoni (Weise, 1902)
57. Stolas eugenea (Boheman, 1862)
58. Stolas eurydice (Spaeth, 1917)
59. Stolas excelsa (Spaeth, 1917)
60. Stolas extricata (Boheman, 1850)
61. Stolas famula (Spaeth, 1928)
62. Stolas fasciculata (Boheman, 1850)
63. Stolas fasciculosa (Spaeth, 1909)
64. Stolas festiva (Klug, 1829)
65. Stolas flavipennis (Boheman, 1850)
66. Stolas flavofenestrata (Boheman, 1862)
67. Stolas flavoguttata (Boheman, 1850)
68. Stolas flavomarginata Borowiec, 1999
69. Stolas flavonotata (Boheman, 1856)
70. Stolas flavoreticulata (Boheman, 1856)
71. Stolas floccosa (Erichson, 1847)
72. Stolas foveolatipennis (Spaeth, 1937)
73. Stolas funebris (Boheman, 1850)
74. Stolas glabricollis (Boheman, 1850)
75. Stolas godeti (Boheman, 1850)
76. Stolas haematites (Lichtenstein, 1795)
77. Stolas hameli Borowiec, 2007
78. Stolas helleri (Spaeth, 1915)
79. Stolas hermanni (Spaeth, 1911)
80. Stolas honorifica (Boheman, 1862)
81. Stolas huanocensis (Spaeth, 1901)
82. Stolas hypocrita (Boheman, 1862)
83. Stolas ignita (Boheman, 1850)
84. Stolas iheringi (Spaeth, 1913)
85. Stolas illustris (Chevrolat, 1834)
86. Stolas imitatrix Borowiec, 1999
87. Stolas imparilis (Boheman, 1862)
88. Stolas imperialis (Spaeth, 1898), imperial tortoise beetle
89. Stolas implexa (Boheman, 1850)
90. Stolas impluviata (Boheman, 1850)
91. Stolas impudens (Boheman, 1856)
92. Stolas inaequalis (Linnaeus, 1758)
93. Stolas inaurata (Burmeister, 1870)
94. Stolas inca (Spaeth, 1901)
95. Stolas indigacea (Boheman, 1850)
96. Stolas inermis (Boheman, 1862)
97. Stolas inexculta (Boheman, 1862)
98. Stolas insipida (Spaeth, 1932)
99. Stolas interjecta (Baly, 1872)
100. Stolas intermedia Borowiec, 1999
101. Stolas isthmica (Champion, 1893)
102. Stolas kaestneri (Spaeth, 1932)
103. Stolas kollari (Boheman, 1850)
104. Stolas kraatzi (Boheman, 1862)
105. Stolas lacertosa (Boheman, 1862)
106. Stolas lacordairei (Boheman, 1850)
107. Stolas lacunosa (Boheman, 1850)
108. Stolas lata (Boheman, 1850)
109. Stolas latevittata (Boheman, 1862)
110. Stolas lebasii (Boheman, 1850)
111. Stolas lenis (Boheman, 1850)
112. Stolas lineaticollis (Boheman, 1850)
113. Stolas mannerheimi (Boheman, 1850)
114. Stolas mellyi (Boheman, 1850)
115. Stolas metallica (De Mey, 1838)
116. Stolas modica (Boheman, 1850)
117. Stolas murina (Spaeth, 1911)
118. Stolas napoensis Borowiec, 1998
119. Stolas nickerli (Spaeth, 1901)
120. Stolas nigrolineata (Champion, 1893)
121. Stolas niobe (Spaeth, 1919)
122. Stolas nudicollis (Boheman, 1850)
123. Stolas oblita (Boheman, 1850)
124. Stolas obvoluta (Boheman, 1862)
125. Stolas octosignata (Spaeth, 1913)
126. Stolas omaspidiformis Borowiec, 2007
127. Stolas pallidoguttata (Blanchard, 1837)
128. Stolas paranensis (Spaeth, 1928)
129. Stolas pascoei (Baly, 1872)
130. Stolas paulista (Spaeth, 1935)
131. Stolas pauperula (Baly, 1872)
132. Stolas pectinata (Baly, 1872)
133. Stolas pellicula (Spaeth, 1915)
134. Stolas perezi Borowiec, 1998
135. Stolas perfuga (Spaeth, 1926)
136. Stolas perjucunda (Baly, 1872)
137. Stolas pertusa (Boheman, 1850)
138. Stolas placida (Spaeth, 1911)
139. Stolas plagicollis (Boheman, 1850)
140. Stolas pleurosticha (Erichson, 1847)
141. Stolas praecalva (Spaeth, 1942)
142. Stolas praetoria (Spaeth, 1928)
143. Stolas puberula (Boheman, 1856)
144. Stolas pubipennis (Boheman, 1862)
145. Stolas pucallpaensis Borowiec and Takizawa, 2011
146. Stolas pullata (Spaeth, 1911)
147. Stolas punicea (Boheman, 1850)
148. Stolas quatuordecimsignata (Boheman, 1850)
149. Stolas quinquefasciata (Wagener, 1877)
150. Stolas redtenbacheri (Boheman, 1850)
151. Stolas reticularis (Linnaeus, 1758)
152. Stolas rubicundula (Boheman, 1856)
153. Stolas rubroreticulata (Boheman, 1856)
154. Stolas rufocincta (Wagener, 1881)
155. Stolas sanguineovittata Borowiec, 1998
156. Stolas sanramonensis Borowiec, 2005
157. Stolas saundersi (Boheman, 1856)
158. Stolas schaumi (Boheman, 1850)
159. Stolas scoparia Erichson, 1847
160. Stolas selecta (Spaeth, 1928)
161. Stolas sexplagiata (Boheman, 1850)
162. Stolas sexsignata (Boheman, 1850)
163. Stolas sexstillata (Boheman, 1856)
164. Stolas socialis (Spaeth, 1932)
165. Stolas sommeri (Boheman, 1850)
166. Stolas stevensi (Boheman, 1856)
167. Stolas stolida (Spaeth, 1917)
168. Stolas stragula (Boheman, 1862)
169. Stolas stygia (Spaeth, 1932)
170. Stolas subcaudata (Spaeth, 1926)
171. Stolas submetallica (Weise, 1902)
172. Stolas subreticulata (Boheman, 1850)
173. Stolas suspiciosa (Boheman, 1850)
174. Stolas suturalis (Fabricius, 1777)
175. Stolas tachiraensis Borowiec, 2009
176. Stolas thoreyi (Boheman, 1862)
177. Stolas tumulus (Boheman, 1850)
178. Stolas uniformis Borowiec and Swietojanska, 2010
179. Stolas verecunda (Boheman, 1850)
180. Stolas vetula (Boheman, 1850)
181. Stolas vicina (Boheman, 1850)
182. Stolas vidua (Boheman, 1850)
183. Stolas vorax (Weise, 1902)
184. Stolas warchalowskii Borowiec, 2007
185. Stolas zonata (Spaeth, 1902)
186. Stolas zumbaensis Borowiec, 1998
