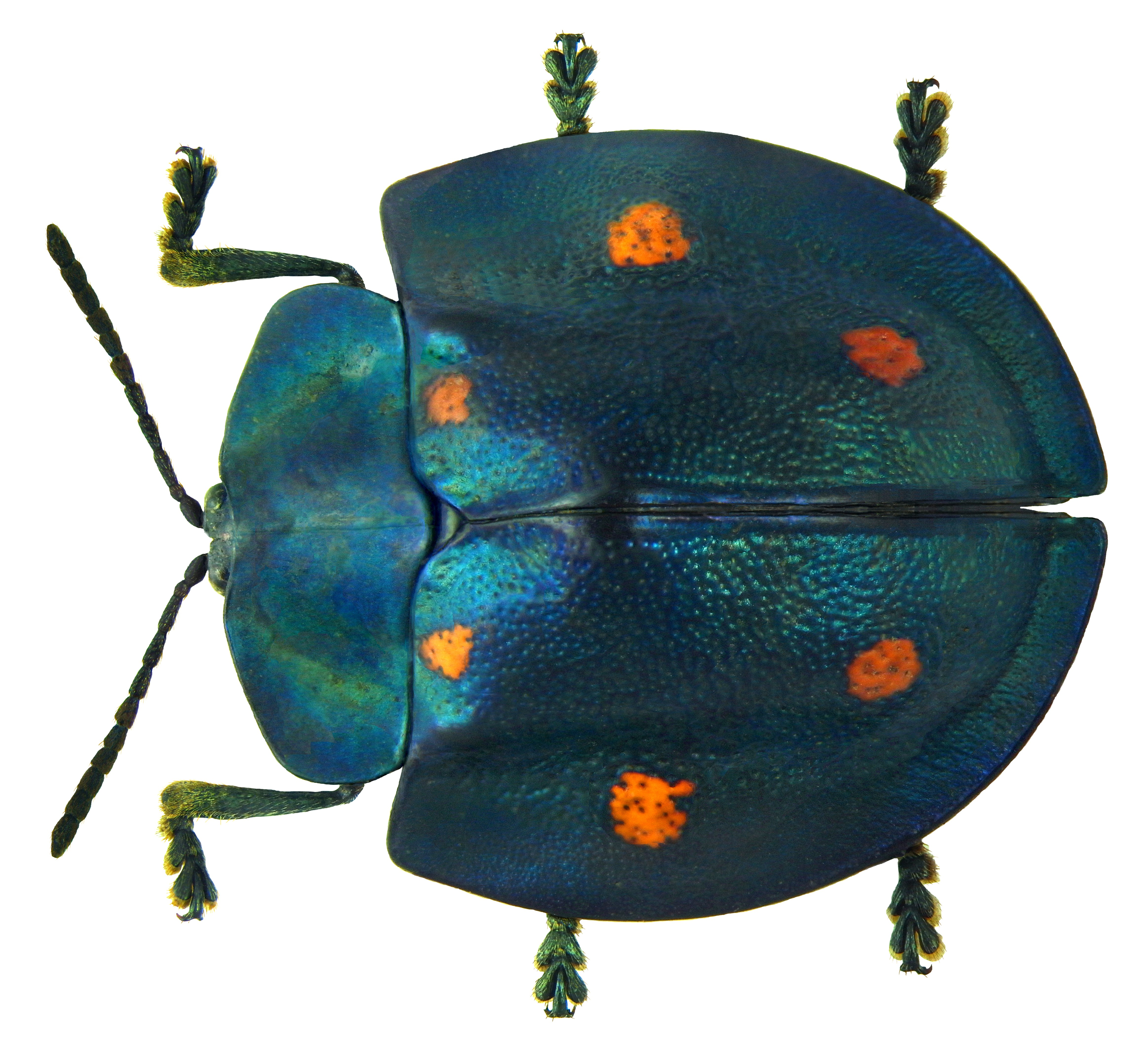

Scientific classification
- Kingdom: Animalia
- Phylum: Arthropoda
- Clade: Pancrustacea
- Class: Insecta
- Order: Coleoptera
- Suborder: Polyphaga
- Infraorder: Cucujiformia
- Family: Chrysomelidae
- Genus: Cyrtonota
- Species: C. sexpustulata

Binomial name
- Cyrtonota sexpustulata (Fabricius, 1781)

Synonyms
- Cassida sexpustulata (Fabricius, 1781); Mesomphalia sexpustulata Hope, 1840

= Cyrtonota sexpustulata =

Species of beetle

Cyrtonota sexpustulata is a leaf beetle belonging to the family Chrysomelidae.

== Description ==
Cyrtonota sexpustulata can reach a length of 13–14 millimetres (0.51–0.55 in). Body is dark bluish or black with six orange-red spots on the elytrae. The main host plant is Ipomoea batatas (Convolvulaceae).

== Distribution ==
This species can be found in Brazil.
