= Stolas decemguttata =

Scientific classification
- Kingdom: Animalia
- Phylum: Arthropoda
- Clade: Pancrustacea
- Class: Insecta
- Order: Coleoptera
- Suborder: Polyphaga
- Infraorder: Cucujiformia
- Family: Chrysomelidae
- Genus: Stolas
- Species: S. decemguttata

Binomial name
- Stolas decemguttata (Sturm, 1828)

Synonyms
- Cassida decemguttata Sturm, 1828; Pseudomesomphalia decemguttata

Species of beetle

Stolas decemguttata is a species of beetle of the family Chrysomelidae. It is found in Bolivia, Brazil (Pará, Pernambuco), Colombia and French Guiana.
