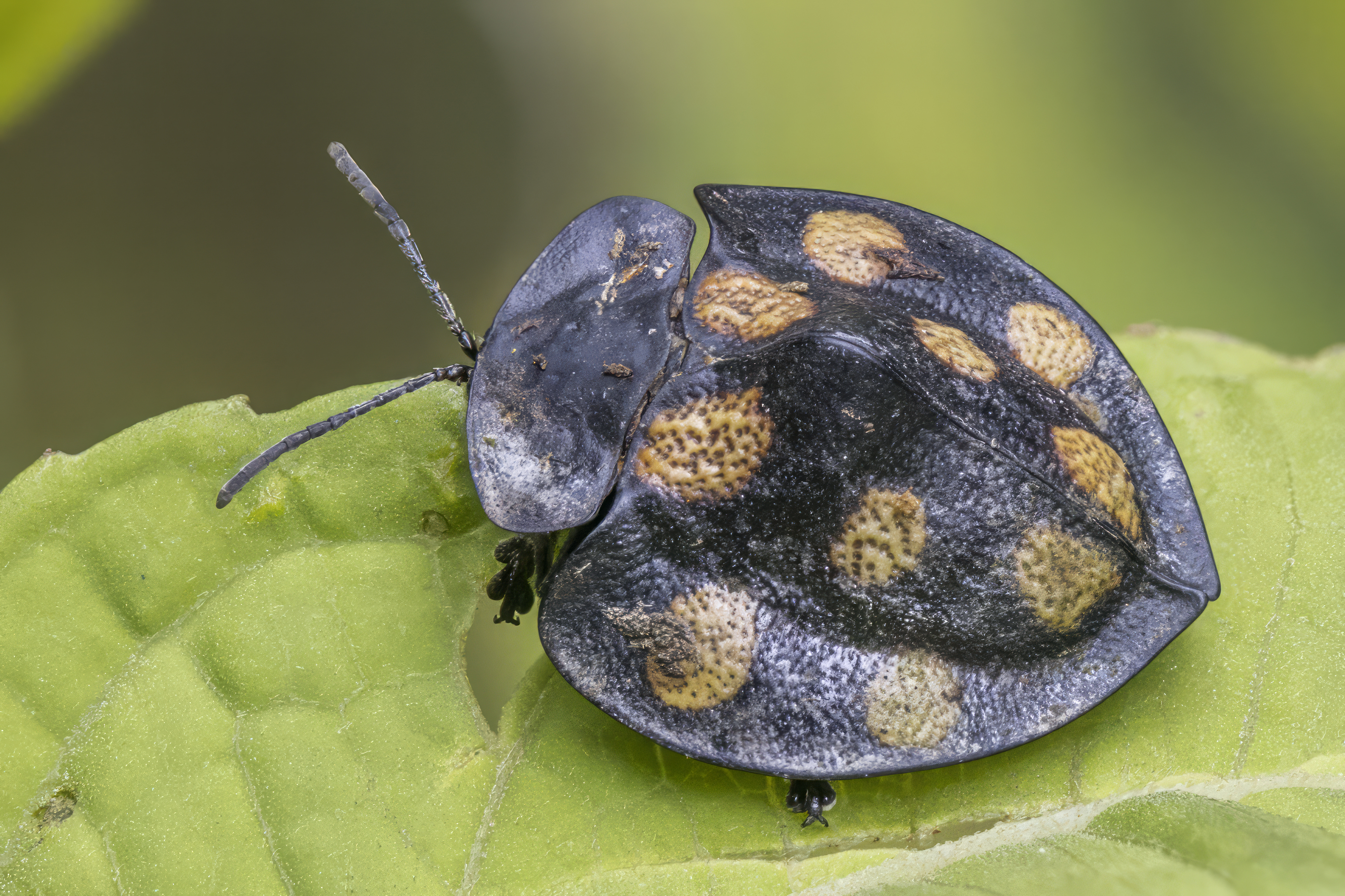
- Cyrtonota sp., Colombia
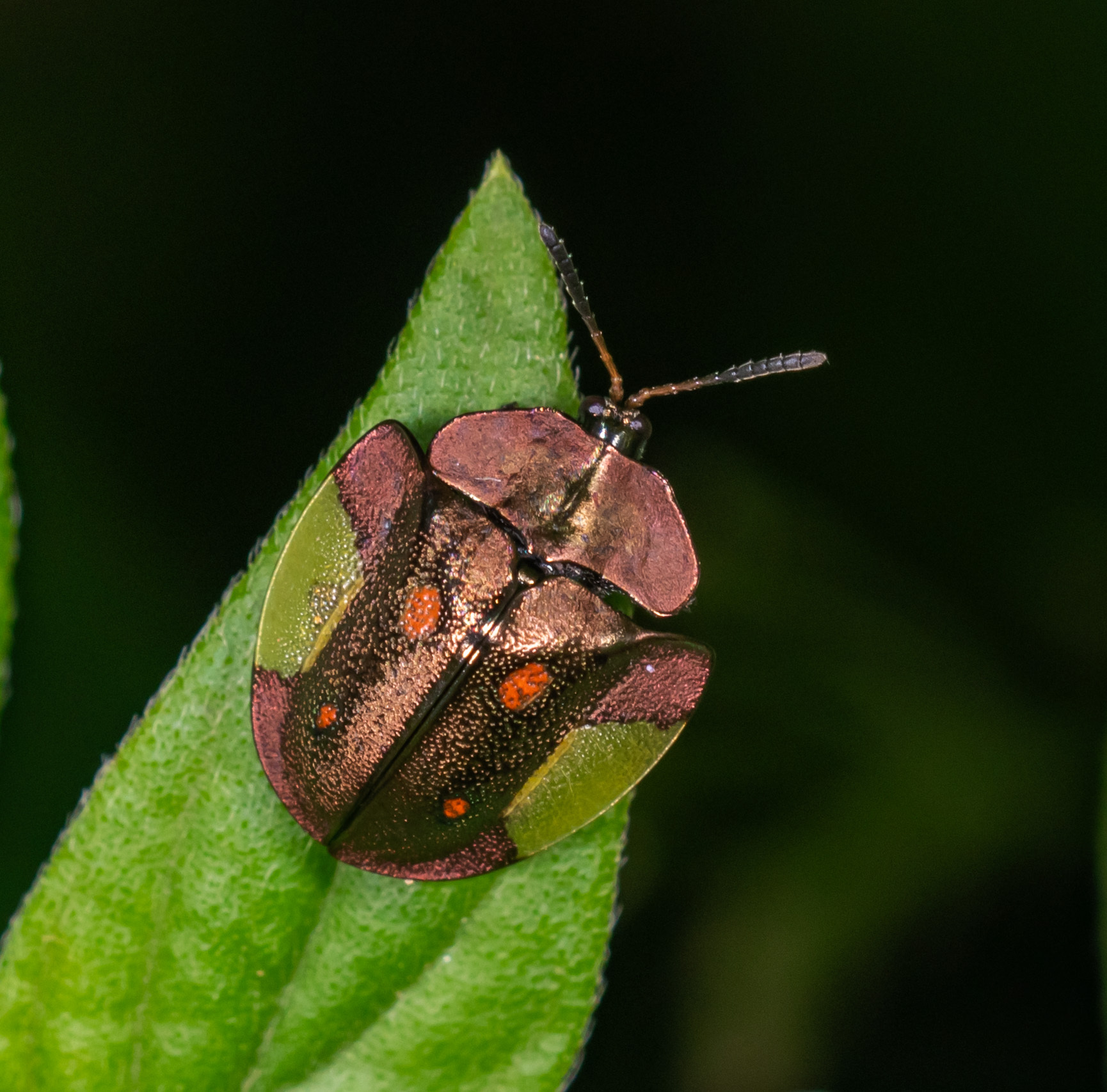
- C. serinus from Peru

Scientific classification
- Kingdom: Animalia
- Phylum: Arthropoda
- Clade: Pancrustacea
- Class: Insecta
- Order: Coleoptera
- Suborder: Polyphaga
- Infraorder: Cucujiformia
- Family: Chrysomelidae
- Subfamily: Cassidinae
- Genus: Cyrtonota; Chevrolat, 1837

Synonyms
- Neomphalia Spaeth, 1913; Semaia Spaeth, 1909

= Cyrtonota =

Genus of beetles

Cyrtonota is a genus of leaf beetles belonging to the family Chrysomelidae.

== Species ==
- Cyrtonota abrili Borowiec & Świętojańska, 2015
- Cyrtonota adspersa (Boheman, 1850)
- Cyrtonota assimilis (Boheman, 1850)
- Cyrtonota aurovestita (Spaeth, 1932)
- Cyrtonota balyi (Kirsch, 1883)
- Cyrtonota banghaasi (Spaeth, 1902)
- Cyrtonota bergeali Borowiec & Sassi, 1999
- Cyrtonota bistigma (Boheman, 1856)
- Cyrtonota bondari (Spaeth, 1928)
- Cyrtonota botanocharoides Borowiec, 1989
- Cyrtonota bugaensis Borowiec & Sassi, 1999
- Cyrtonota caprishensis Sekerka, 2007
- Cyrtonota caudata (Boheman, 1850)
- Cyrtonota compulsa (Spaeth, 1909)
- Cyrtonota conglomerata (Boheman, 1862)
- Cyrtonota cyanea (Linnaeus, 1758)
- Cyrtonota deliciosa (Baly, 1872)
- Cyrtonota dignitosa (Boheman, 1862)
- Cyrtonota dimidiata (Boheman, 1850)
- Cyrtonota dissecta (Boheman, 1850)
- Cyrtonota elongata (Spaeth, 1932)
- Cyrtonota flavoplagiata (Spaeth, 1932)
- Cyrtonota gibbera Borowiec, 1989
- Cyrtonota goryi (Boheman, 1850)
- Cyrtonota honorata (Baly, 1869)
- Cyrtonota huallagensis (Spaeth, 1913)
- Cyrtonota informis (Boheman, 1862)
- Cyrtonota inspicata (Spaeth, 1913)
- Cyrtonota jekeli (Boheman, 1856)
- Cyrtonota kolbei (Spaeth, 1907)
- Cyrtonota lateralis (Linnaeus, 1758)
- Cyrtonota lojana (Spaeth, 1913)
- Cyrtonota lurida (Spaeth, 1913)
- Cyrtonota machupicchu Borowiec & Sassi, 1999
- Cyrtonota marginata (Kirsch, 1883)
- Cyrtonota moderata (Spaeth, 1913)
- Cyrtonota montana Borowiec, 2000
- Cyrtonota nitida Borowiec & Sassi, 1999
- Cyrtonota paupertina (Boheman, 1862)
- Cyrtonota pavens (Spaeth, 1913)
- Cyrtonota plumbea (Germar, 1824)
- Cyrtonota poecilaspoides (Baly, 1872)
- Cyrtonota punctatissima (Spaeth, 1901)
- Cyrtonota quadrinotata (Boheman, 1862)
- Cyrtonota ruforeticulata Borowiec, 2007
- Cyrtonota santanderensis Borowiec, 2009
- Cyrtonota serinus Erichson, 1847
- Cyrtonota sexguttata (Spaeth, 1913)
- Cyrtonota sexpustulata (Fabricius, 1781)
- Cyrtonota similata (Boheman, 1850)
- Cyrtonota smaragdina (Boheman, 1856)
- Cyrtonota steinheili (Wagener, 1877)
- Cyrtonota subnotata (Boheman, 1850)
- Cyrtonota textilis (Boheman, 1850)
- Cyrtonota thalassina (Boheman, 1850)
- Cyrtonota tigrina (Boheman, 1850)
- Cyrtonota timida Sassi, 2008
- Cyrtonota trigonata (Spaeth, 1901)
- Cyrtonota tristigma (Boheman, 1850)
- Cyrtonota verrucosa (Boheman, 1856)
- Cyrtonota viridicaerulea (Boheman, 1862)
- Cyrtonota vulnerata (Boheman, 1850)
- Cyrtonota zikani (Spaeth, 1932)
