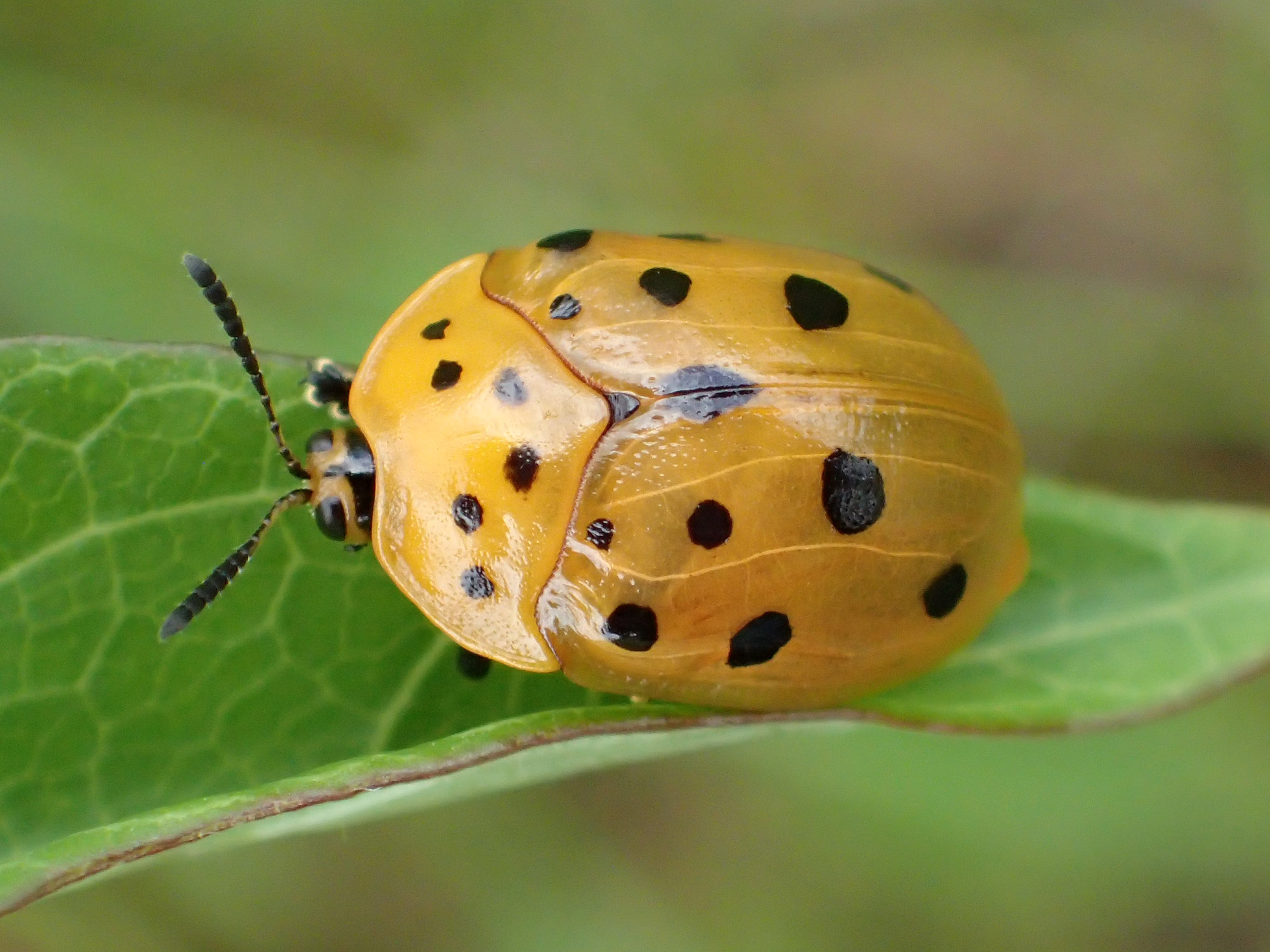

Scientific classification
- Kingdom: Animalia
- Phylum: Arthropoda
- Clade: Pancrustacea
- Class: Insecta
- Order: Coleoptera
- Suborder: Polyphaga
- Infraorder: Cucujiformia
- Family: Chrysomelidae
- Genus: Chelymorpha
- Species: C. cassidea

Binomial name
- Chelymorpha cassidea (Fabricius, 1775)

= Chelymorpha cassidea =

Species of beetle

Chelymorpha cassidea, known generally as the Argus tortoise beetle or milkweed tortoise beetle, is a species of leaf beetle in the family Chrysomelidae. It is found in the Caribbean and North America.

== Description ==
=== Adult ===
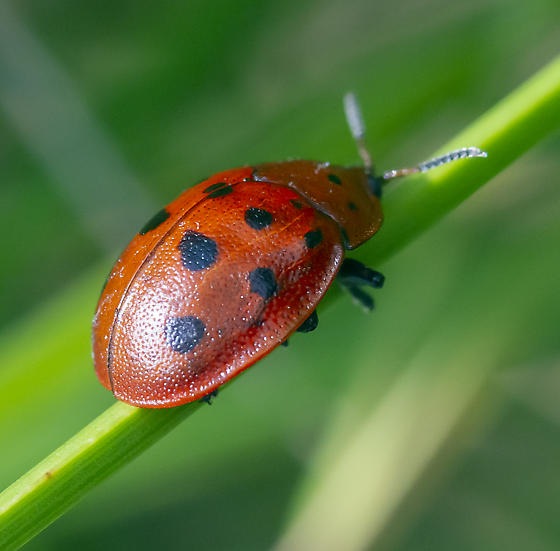
Argus Tortoise Beetle (Chelymorpha cassidea) color variant

The beetle is 9 to 12 mm (0.35 to 0.47 in) long and is yellow to bright red with black spots. It is one of the largest leaf beetles native to North America. The name Argus comes from the mythical Greek giant Argus Panoptes, who was sometimes depicted with 100 eyes, because the beetle is able to stretch out its red head beyond its pronotum, as if it were a single red eye. The species resembles a small turtle and is similar to a ladybug.

=== Egg, larva, and pupa ===
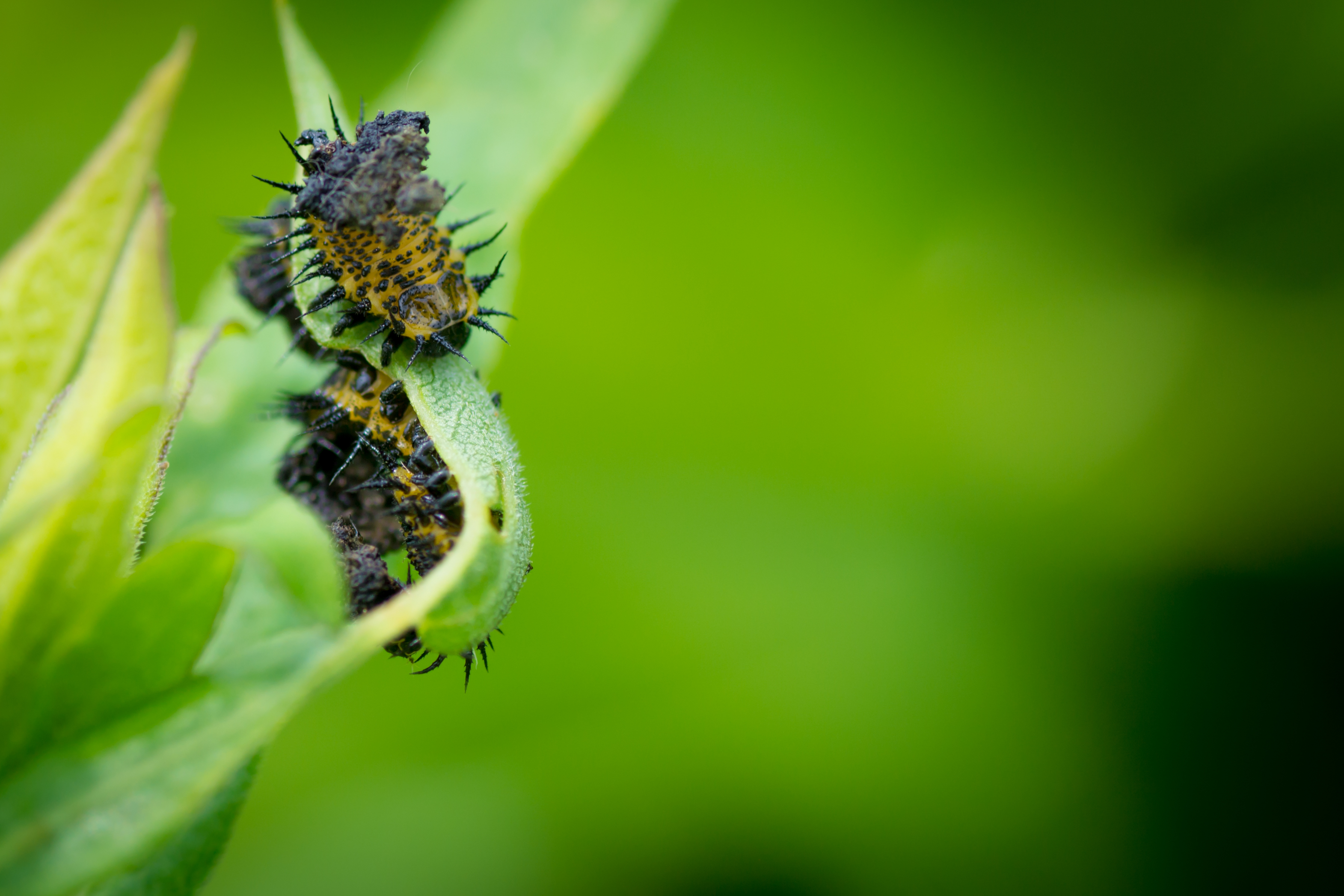
Larvae with fecal shields

The Argus tortoise beetle lays eggs on leaves, in clusters of 15 to 30. The eggs hatch within 10 days. Its larvae are yellowish-green or orange-yellow. The larvae feed on leaves until they are fully grown, then they drop to the soil to pupate, overwintering as pupae before emerging as adults in the middle of summer. It takes them almost three weeks to become pupae.

== Habitat ==
The beetle can be found throughout North America in meadows and roadsides. It can also be found in the Caribbean. It feeds on the foliage of plants, including milkweed, raspberry, maize, and sweet potato. It can defoliate entire plants. One plant that it feeds on is the morning glory, which has leaves that are protected by alkaloids. Some alkaloids can poison nerves and can be deadly to people and animals. It is possible that the beetle stores the alkaloids in its body to protect itself from predators.

== Predators ==
Predators of the beetle include the Hymenopteran egg parasite Emersonella niveipes, the tachinid larval parasite Masicera exilis, and the predatory stink bug Apateticus bracteatus.
