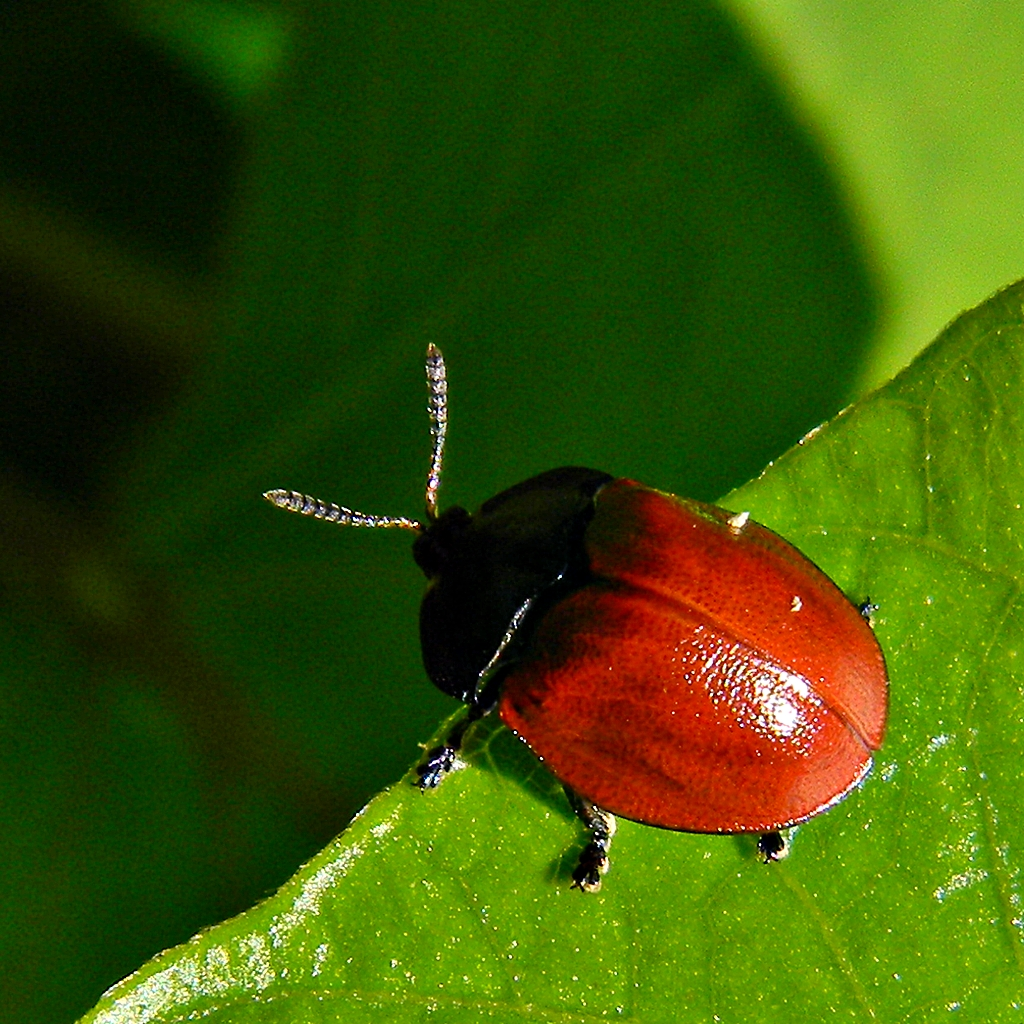

Scientific classification
- Kingdom: Animalia
- Phylum: Arthropoda
- Clade: Pancrustacea
- Class: Insecta
- Order: Coleoptera
- Suborder: Polyphaga
- Infraorder: Cucujiformia
- Family: Chrysomelidae
- Genus: Chelymorpha
- Species: C. cribraria

Binomial name
- Chelymorpha cribraria (Fabricius, 1775)

= Chelymorpha cribraria =

Species of beetle

Chelymorpha cribraria is a species of leaf beetle in the family Chrysomelidae. It is found in the Caribbean Sea, Central America, North America, and South America. This beetle is often mistaken for the neotropical tortoise beetle (Chelymorpha alternans) due to their similar color and shape.

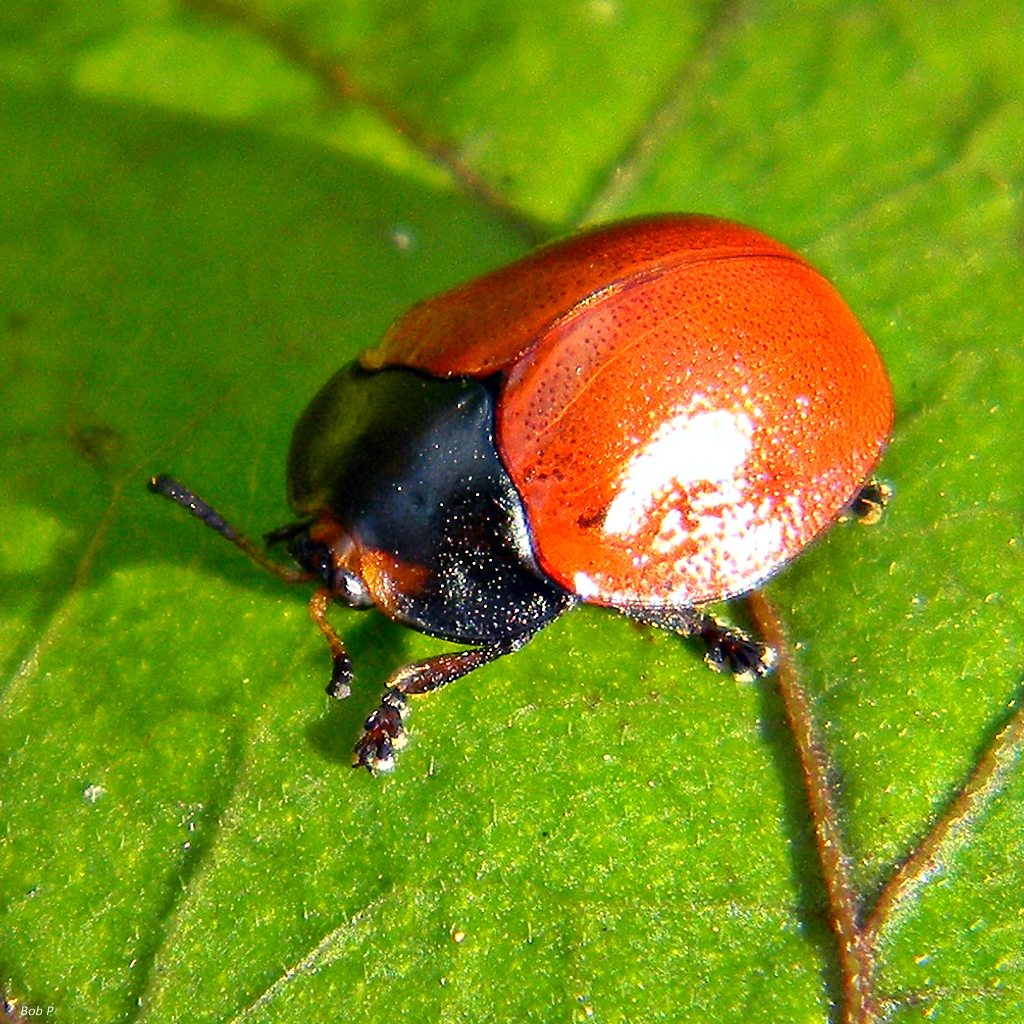
