= Deloyala barberi =

Scientific classification
- Kingdom: Animalia
- Phylum: Arthropoda
- Class: Insecta
- Order: Coleoptera
- Suborder: Polyphaga
- Infraorder: Cucujiformia
- Family: Chrysomelidae
- Genus: Deloyala
- Species: D. barberi

Binomial name
- Deloyala barberi (Spaeth, 1936)

Species of beetle

Deloyala barberi is a species of tortoise beetle in the family Chrysomelidae. It is found in North America.
