= Estigmena =

Scientific classification
- Kingdom: Animalia
- Phylum: Arthropoda
- Class: Insecta
- Order: Coleoptera
- Suborder: Polyphaga
- Infraorder: Cucujiformia
- Family: Chrysomelidae
- Subfamily: Cassidinae
- Tribe: Anisoderini
- Genus: Estigmena; Hope, 1840

Genus of leaf beetles

Estigmena is a genus of beetles belonging to the family Chrysomelidae.

== Species ==
- Estigmena bicolor Bhasin, 1950
- Estigmena chinensis Hope, 1840
- Estigmena cribricollis Waterhouse, 1881
- Estigmena dohertyi Uhmann, 1951
- Estigmena mannaensis (Uhmann, 1930)
