= Cyclosoma =

- Cyclosoma nigritarsis

Scientific classification
- Kingdom: Animalia
- Phylum: Arthropoda
- Clade: Pancrustacea
- Class: Insecta
- Order: Coleoptera
- Suborder: Polyphaga
- Infraorder: Cucujiformia
- Family: Chrysomelidae
- Subfamily: Cassidinae
- Tribe: Omocerini
- Genus: Cyclosoma; Guérin-Méneville, 1835

Synonyms
- Proglima Hincks, 1950; Glima Spaeth, 1913; Prenea Spaeth, 1913; Dolichotoma Hope, 1839

Genus of beetles

Cyclosoma is a genus of leaf beetles of the family Chrysomelidae.

== Species ==
- subgenus Cyclosoma
  - Cyclosoma anomala (Boheman, 1862)
  - Cyclosoma palliata (Fabricius, 1787)
  - Cyclosoma tarsata (Boheman, 1850)
  - Cyclosoma tristis (Guérin-Méneville, 1844)
- subgenus Dolichotoma Hope, 1840
  - Cyclosoma aterrima (Herbst, 1799)
  - Cyclosoma bohemanii (Guérin-Méneville, 1855)
  - Cyclosoma chloris (Hope, 1840)
  - Cyclosoma clypeata (Boheman, 1850)
  - Cyclosoma fuscopunctata (Spaeth, 1919)
  - Cyclosoma germari (Spaeth, 1913)
  - Cyclosoma inepta (Boheman, 1850)
  - Cyclosoma lugens (Germar, 1824)
  - Cyclosoma mitis (Boheman, 1850)
  - Cyclosoma spurca (Boheman, 1856)
- subgenus Monrosiacassis Viana, 1964
  - Cyclosoma bicostata Borowiec, 1999
  - Cyclosoma nigritarsis (Boheman, 1856)
  - Cyclosoma puberula (Boheman, 1850)
  - Cyclosoma sericata (Guérin-Méneville, 1844)
  - Cyclosoma strigata (Panzer, 1798)
- subgenus Proglima Hincks, 1950
  - Cyclosoma mirabilis (Boheman, 1856)
  - Cyclosoma satanas (Weise, 1896)
