= Delocrania cossyphoides =

Scientific classification
- Kingdom: Animalia
- Phylum: Arthropoda
- Clade: Pancrustacea
- Class: Insecta
- Order: Coleoptera
- Suborder: Polyphaga
- Infraorder: Cucujiformia
- Family: Chrysomelidae
- Genus: Delocrania
- Species: D. cossyphoides

Binomial name
- Delocrania cossyphoides Guérin-Méneville, 1844

Species of beetle

Delocrania cossyphoides is a species of beetle of the family Chrysomelidae. It is found in Brazil (Amazonas, Bahia, Paraná, Pernambuco), Trinidad and Venezuela.

== Life history ==
The recorded host plants are Cocos nucifera, Diplothemium, Attalea and Elaeis species.
