= Notosacantha vicaria =

Scientific classification
- Kingdom: Animalia
- Phylum: Arthropoda
- Class: Insecta
- Order: Coleoptera
- Suborder: Polyphaga
- Infraorder: Cucujiformia
- Family: Chrysomelidae
- Genus: Notosacantha
- Species: N. vicaria

Binomial name
- Notosacantha vicaria (Spaeth, 1913)

Species of beetle

Notosacantha vicaria is a species of leaf beetle native to India, and Sri Lanka.

== Description ==
Host plants are Carallia brachiata and Glochidion ellipticum. The breeding season of the beetle is from July to September. These small beetle have an average length of 4.16 mm. Female is larger than the male. Adult has shiny yellowish elytra and dark brown prothorax just after pupal exclosion. But after few hours, it becomes totally brown in color. With time, a waxy coating can be found on the head, prothorax and elytra. Due to this coat, adult is visible as whitish and dull. Elytral tubercles are very small. Costae are very low, and without marked tubercles. The spots of explanate margin of elytra generally extends 2/3 width of marginalia.

Final instar grub is dorsoventrally flattened, and elongated with an average length about 5.2 mm. Head is sclerotized. Antennae short and 3-segmented. There are 5 ocelli on each side of the head. Prothorax plate-like. There is a curved, ear-like translucent plate found on the antero-lateral margin of pronotum. Both mesothorax and metathorax have fine setae laterally. Each abdominal segment has two short lateral processes. There are 8 spiracle pairs arranged in pairs on 8 abdominal segments. The larvae are leaf miners that feed on the leaf completely. Pupation occurs within the non-feeding leaves, mainly closer to the midrib. This pupal mine has a characteristic shape that is longer than broad. Outer cover of the pupal mine is brown. Pupa is about 4.9 mm long. Prothorax is visible as a broad triangular plate with a tinge of brown pigment patch.
