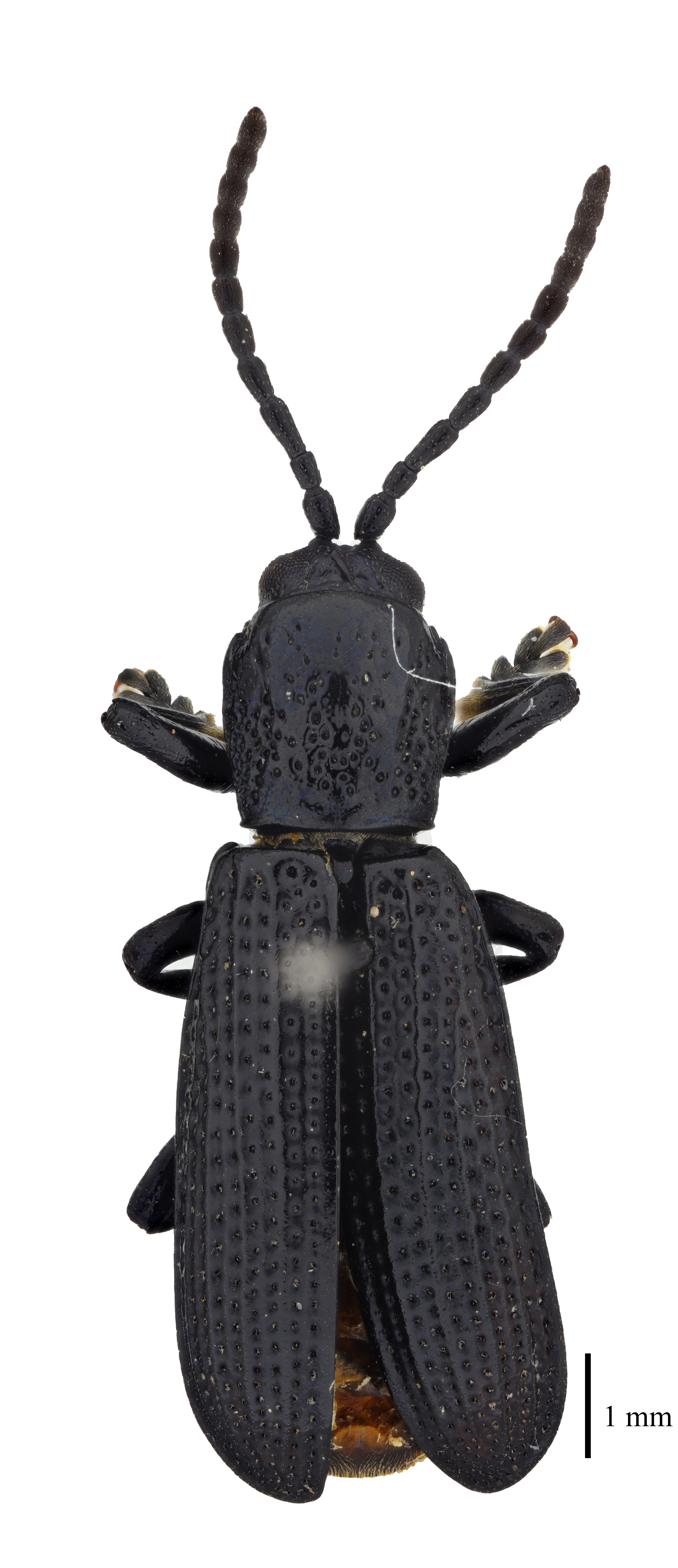
- Lasiochila anthracina

Scientific classification
- Kingdom: Animalia
- Phylum: Arthropoda
- Clade: Pancrustacea
- Class: Insecta
- Order: Coleoptera
- Suborder: Polyphaga
- Infraorder: Cucujiformia
- Family: Chrysomelidae
- Subfamily: Cassidinae
- Tribe: Anisoderini
- Genus: Lasiochila; Weise, 1916

Synonyms
- Anisoderopsis Maulik, 1916

= Lasiochila =

Genus of leaf beetles

Lasiochila is a genus of beetles belonging to the family Chrysomelidae.

== Species ==
- Lasiochila angusta Uhmann, 1954
- Lasiochila anthracina Yu, 1985
- Lasiochila bakeri Uhmann, 1930
- Lasiochila bicolor Pic, 1924
- Lasiochila cylindrica (Hope, 1831)
- Lasiochila dimidiatipennis Chen & Yu, 1962
- Lasiochila estigmenoides Chen & Yu, 1962
- Lasiochila excavata (Baly, 1858)
- Lasiochila feae (Baly, 1888)
- Lasiochila fukiena Gressitt, 1950
- Lasiochila gestroi (Baly, 1888)
- Lasiochila goryi (Guérin-Méneville, 1840)
- Lasiochila imitans Uhmann, 1951
- Lasiochila insularis (Gestro, 1917)
- Lasiochila jitrana Uhmann, 1954
- Lasiochila latior Yu, 1985
- Lasiochila longipennis (Gestro, 1906)
- Lasiochila macilenta (Gestro, 1906)
- Lasiochila mediovittata (Gestro, 1920)
- Lasiochila monticola Chen & Yu, 1964
- Lasiochila nasuellii (Gestro, 1890)
- Lasiochila nigra (Maulik, 1919)
- Lasiochila parallela (Chapuis, 1876)
- Lasiochila rufa (Guérin-Méneville, 1840)
- Lasiochila thoracica (Chapuis, 1876)
- Lasiochila vitalisi (Maulik, 1919)
