= Hybosispa =

Scientific classification
- Kingdom: Animalia
- Phylum: Arthropoda
- Class: Insecta
- Order: Coleoptera
- Suborder: Polyphaga
- Infraorder: Cucujiformia
- Family: Chrysomelidae
- Subfamily: Cassidinae
- Tribe: Hybosispini
- Genus: Hybosispa; Weise, 1910

Genus of leaf beetles

Hybosispa is a genus of central and South American beetles belonging to the family Chrysomelidae.

== Species ==
- Hybosispa bipartita
- Hybosispa claripes (Pic, 1923)
- Hybosispa delectabilis (Staines, 1996)
- Hybosispa macella (Pic, 1923)
- Hybosispa melanura Weise, 1910 - type species
- Hybosispa nitida Uhmann, 1939
- Hybosispa rufiventris Uhmann, 1940
- Hybosispa strandi Uhmann, 1933
- Hybosispa sulciceps (Baly, 1885)
- Hybosispa truncatipennis (Baly, 1869)
