= Solenispa =

Scientific classification
- Kingdom: Animalia
- Phylum: Arthropoda
- Class: Insecta
- Order: Coleoptera
- Suborder: Polyphaga
- Infraorder: Cucujiformia
- Family: Chrysomelidae
- Subfamily: Cassidinae
- Tribe: Hybosispini
- Genus: Solenispa; Weise, 1905

Genus of leaf beetles

Solenispa is a genus of central American leaf beetles belonging to the tribe Hybosispini.

== Species ==
- Solenispa angustata
- Solenispa angusticollis
- Solenispa bicolor
- Solenispa bifoveolata
- Solenispa germaini
- Solenispa impressicollis Weise, 1905 - type species
- Solenispa laetifica
- Solenispa leptomorpha
