= Lasiochila fukiena =

Scientific classification
- Kingdom: Animalia
- Phylum: Arthropoda
- Class: Insecta
- Order: Coleoptera
- Suborder: Polyphaga
- Infraorder: Cucujiformia
- Family: Chrysomelidae
- Genus: Lasiochila
- Species: L. fukiena

Binomial name
- Lasiochila fukiena Gressitt, 1950

Synonyms
- Lasiochila insulana fukiena Gressitt, 1950

Species of beetle

Lasiochila fukiena is a species of beetle of the family Chrysomelidae. It is found in China (Fukien).

== Taxonomy ==
This species was long treated as a synonym of Lasiochila bicolor, but later research revealed that it is distinct. Although both species share the body shape, they differ in the structure of head and elytra.
