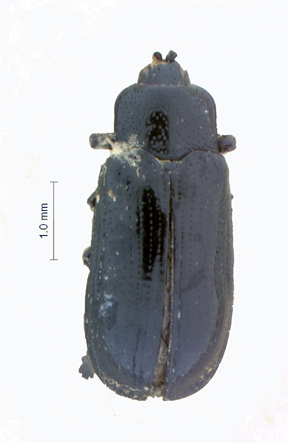

Scientific classification
- Kingdom: Animalia
- Phylum: Arthropoda
- Class: Insecta
- Order: Coleoptera
- Suborder: Polyphaga
- Infraorder: Cucujiformia
- Family: Chrysomelidae
- Subfamily: Cassidinae
- Tribe: Leptispini
- Genus: Ovotispa; L. Medvedev, 1992
- Species: O. atricolor

Binomial name
- Ovotispa atricolor (Pic, 1928)

Synonyms
- Leptispa atricolor Pic, 1928

= Ovotispa =

Genus of beetles

Ovotispa is a genus of leaf beetles in the family Chrysomelidae. It is monotypic, being represented by the single species, Ovotispa atricolor, which is found in China (Yunnan) and Vietnam.

== Life history ==
No host plant has been documented for this species.
