= Hybosispa macella =

Scientific classification
- Kingdom: Animalia
- Phylum: Arthropoda
- Clade: Pancrustacea
- Class: Insecta
- Order: Coleoptera
- Suborder: Polyphaga
- Infraorder: Cucujiformia
- Family: Chrysomelidae
- Genus: Hybosispa
- Species: H. macella

Binomial name
- Hybosispa macella (Pic, 1923)

Synonyms
- Cephaloleia macella Pic, 1923

Species of beetle

Hybosispa macella is a species of beetle of the family Chrysomelidae. It is found in Bolivia.

== Life history ==
No host plant has been documented for this species.
