= Cyclosoma nigritarsis =

Scientific classification
- Kingdom: Animalia
- Phylum: Arthropoda
- Clade: Pancrustacea
- Class: Insecta
- Order: Coleoptera
- Suborder: Polyphaga
- Infraorder: Cucujiformia
- Family: Chrysomelidae
- Genus: Cyclosoma
- Species: C. nigritarsis

Binomial name
- Cyclosoma nigritarsis (Boheman, 1856)

Synonyms
- Dolichotoma nigritarsis Boheman, 1856; Cyclosoma nigritarse

Species of beetle

Cyclosoma nigritarsis is a species of beetle of the family Chrysomelidae. It is found in Brazil (Paraíba, Pernambuco).
