= Lasiochila longipennis =

Scientific classification
- Kingdom: Animalia
- Phylum: Arthropoda
- Class: Insecta
- Order: Coleoptera
- Suborder: Polyphaga
- Infraorder: Cucujiformia
- Family: Chrysomelidae
- Genus: Lasiochila
- Species: L. longipennis

Binomial name
- Lasiochila longipennis (Gestro, 1906)

Synonyms
- Anisodera longipennis Gestro, 1906; Anisoderopsis krishna Maulik, 1919; Lasiochila rufipennis Pic, 1924; Lasiochila apicalis Pic, 1927

Species of beetle

Lasiochila longipennis is a species of beetle of the family Chrysomelidae. It is found in China (Yunnan), Laos and Vietnam.
