= Hybosispa bipartita =

Scientific classification
- Kingdom: Animalia
- Phylum: Arthropoda
- Clade: Pancrustacea
- Class: Insecta
- Order: Coleoptera
- Suborder: Polyphaga
- Infraorder: Cucujiformia
- Family: Chrysomelidae
- Genus: Hybosispa
- Species: H. bipartita

Binomial name
- Hybosispa bipartita (Pic, 1926)

Synonyms
- Cephalolia bipartita Pic, 1926

Species of beetle

Hybosispa bipartita is a species of beetle of the family Chrysomelidae. It is found in Peru.

No host plant has been documented for this species.
