= Lasiochila gestroi =

Scientific classification
- Kingdom: Animalia
- Phylum: Arthropoda
- Class: Insecta
- Order: Coleoptera
- Suborder: Polyphaga
- Infraorder: Cucujiformia
- Family: Chrysomelidae
- Genus: Lasiochila
- Species: L. gestroi

Binomial name
- Lasiochila gestroi (Baly, 1888)

Synonyms
- Anisodera gestroi Baly, 1888; Lasiochila ruficolor Pic, 1924

Species of beetle

Lasiochila gestroi is a species of beetle of the family Chrysomelidae. It is found in China (Yunnan), Laos, Myanmar, Thailand and Vietnam.
