= Goniocheniini =

- Chlamydocassis bicornuta

Scientific classification
- Kingdom: Animalia
- Phylum: Arthropoda
- Clade: Pancrustacea
- Class: Insecta
- Order: Coleoptera
- Suborder: Polyphaga
- Infraorder: Cucujiformia
- Family: Chrysomelidae
- Subfamily: Cassidinae
- Tribe: Goniocheniini; Spaeth, 1942

Genera
- see text

Tribe of leaf beetles

Goniocheniini is a tribe of leaf beetles within the subfamily Cassidinae; species are recorded from South America.

== Genera ==
As of September 2026, the Global Biodiversity Information Facility includes:

1. Chlamydocassis Spaeth, 1952
2. Goniochenia Weise, 1896
3. Herissa Spaeth, 1909
4. Polychalma Barber & Bridwell, 1940
5. Zeugonota Spaeth, 1913
