= Lasiochila insularis =

Scientific classification
- Kingdom: Animalia
- Phylum: Arthropoda
- Class: Insecta
- Order: Coleoptera
- Suborder: Polyphaga
- Infraorder: Cucujiformia
- Family: Chrysomelidae
- Genus: Lasiochila
- Species: L. insularis

Binomial name
- Lasiochila insularis (Gestro, 1917)

Synonyms
- Anisodera insularis Gestro, 1917

Species of beetle

Lasiochila insularis is a species of beetle of the family Chrysomelidae. It is found in the Philippines (Luzon, Tayabas).
