= Lasiochila monticola =

Scientific classification
- Kingdom: Animalia
- Phylum: Arthropoda
- Class: Insecta
- Order: Coleoptera
- Suborder: Polyphaga
- Infraorder: Cucujiformia
- Family: Chrysomelidae
- Genus: Lasiochila
- Species: L. monticola

Binomial name
- Lasiochila monticola Chen & Yu, 1964

Species of beetle

Lasiochila monticola is a species of beetle of the family Chrysomelidae. It is found in China (Kwangsi).

== Biology ==
They have been recorded feeding on Phyllostachys viridis.
