= Lasiochila bakeri =

Scientific classification
- Kingdom: Animalia
- Phylum: Arthropoda
- Class: Insecta
- Order: Coleoptera
- Suborder: Polyphaga
- Infraorder: Cucujiformia
- Family: Chrysomelidae
- Genus: Lasiochila
- Species: L. bakeri

Binomial name
- Lasiochila bakeri Uhmann, 1930

Species of beetle

Lasiochila bakeri is a species of beetle of the family Chrysomelidae. It is found in the Philippines (Mindanao, Palawan, Samar).
