= Eugenysa =

Scientific classification
- Kingdom: Animalia
- Phylum: Arthropoda
- Clade: Pancrustacea
- Class: Insecta
- Order: Coleoptera
- Suborder: Polyphaga
- Infraorder: Cucujiformia
- Family: Chrysomelidae
- Subfamily: Cassidinae
- Genus: Eugenysa; Chevrolat, 1836

Type species
- Cassida grossa Linnaeus, 1758

Genus of beetles

Eugenysa is a genus of Cassidinae beetles. Maternal care has been reported in some species of this genus, such as Eugenysa coscaroni and Eugenysa columbiana.
