= Estigmena mannaensis =

Scientific classification
- Kingdom: Animalia
- Phylum: Arthropoda
- Clade: Pancrustacea
- Class: Insecta
- Order: Coleoptera
- Suborder: Polyphaga
- Infraorder: Cucujiformia
- Family: Chrysomelidae
- Genus: Estigmena
- Species: E. mannaensis

Binomial name
- Estigmena mannaensis (Uhmann, 1930)

Synonyms
- Anisodera mannaensis Uhmann, 1930

Species of beetle

Estigmena mannaensis is a species of beetle of the family Chrysomelidae. It is found in Indonesia (Java, Sumatra).
