= Hybosispini =

Scientific classification
- Kingdom: Animalia
- Phylum: Arthropoda
- Class: Insecta
- Order: Coleoptera
- Suborder: Polyphaga
- Infraorder: Cucujiformia
- Family: Chrysomelidae
- Subfamily: Cassidinae
- Tribe: Hybosispini; Weise, 1910

Genera
- see text

Tribe of leaf beetles

Hybosispini is a tribe of mostly tropical American leaf beetles within the subfamily Cassidinae.

== Genera ==
1. Hybosispa Weise, 1910
2. Solenispa Weise, 1905
