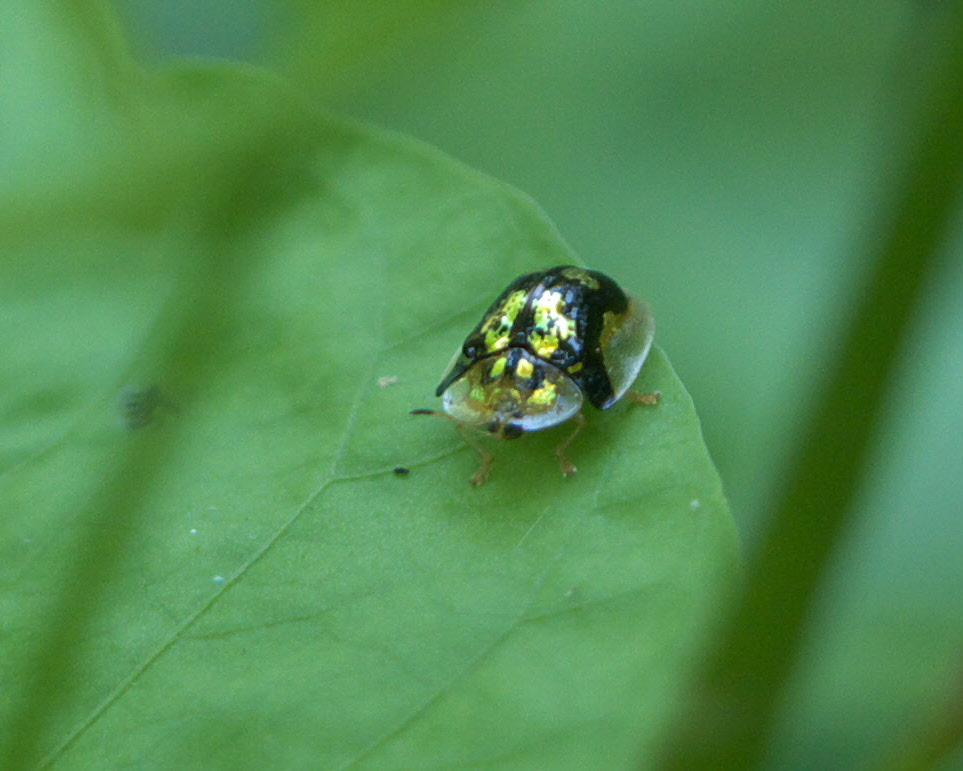
- Deloyala guttata

Scientific classification
- Kingdom: Animalia
- Phylum: Arthropoda
- Clade: Pancrustacea
- Class: Insecta
- Order: Coleoptera
- Suborder: Polyphaga
- Infraorder: Cucujiformia
- Family: Chrysomelidae
- Tribe: Cassidini
- Genus: Deloyala; Chevrolat in Dejean, 1836

= Deloyala =

Genus of beetles

Deloyala is a genus of tortoise beetles in the family Chrysomelidae. There are about 10 described species in Deloyala.

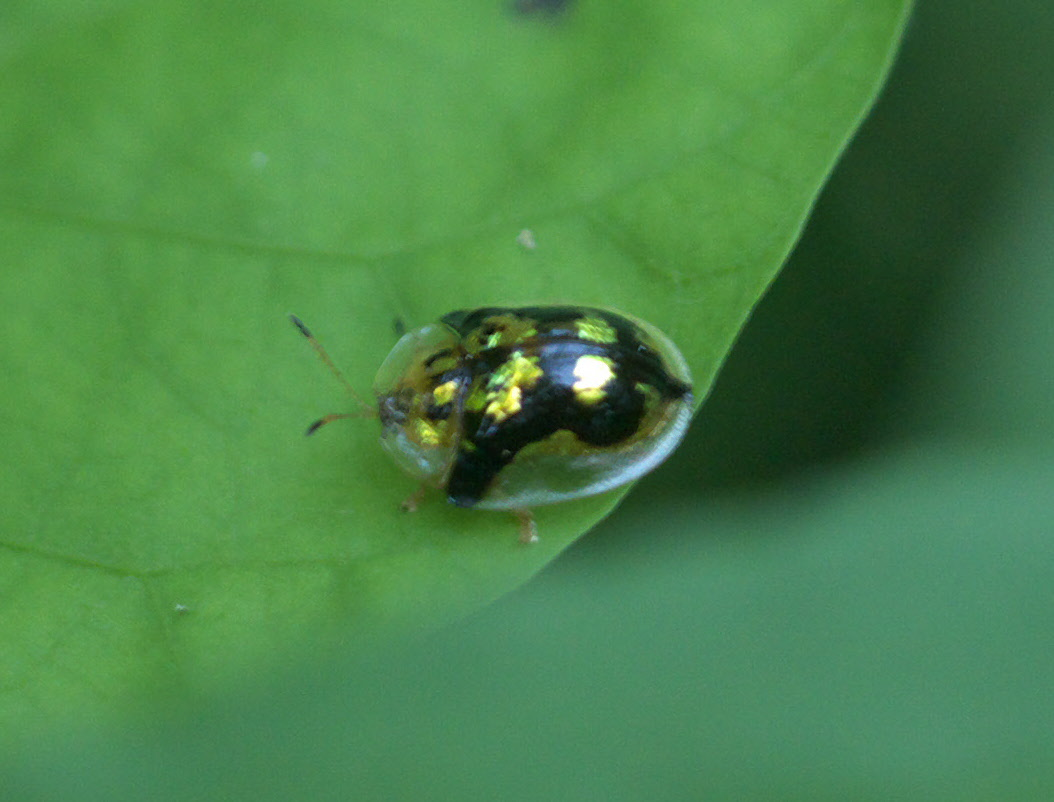
Deloyala guttata

== Species ==
- Deloyala barberi (Spaeth, 1936)
- Deloyala camagueyana (Zayas, 1989)
- Deloyala cruciata (Linnaeus, 1758)
- Deloyala fuliginosa (Olivier, 1790)
- Deloyala guttata (Olivier, 1790) (mottled tortoise beetle)
- Deloyala insubida (Boheman, 1855)
- Deloyala lecontei (Crotch, 1873)
- Deloyala lecontii
- Deloyala trilineata Spaeth, 1936
- Deloyala zetterstedti (Boheman, 1855)
