= Chlamydocassis bicornuta =

Scientific classification
- Kingdom: Animalia
- Phylum: Arthropoda
- Clade: Pancrustacea
- Class: Insecta
- Order: Coleoptera
- Suborder: Polyphaga
- Infraorder: Cucujiformia
- Family: Chrysomelidae
- Genus: Chlamydocassis
- Species: C. bicornuta

Binomial name
- Chlamydocassis bicornuta (Boheman, 1850)

Synonyms
- Desmonota bicornuta Boheman, 1850

Species of beetle

Chlamydocassis bicornuta is a species of beetle of the family Chrysomelidae. It is found in Brazil (Bahia, Ceará, Minas Gerais, Pernambuco), Colombia and Venezuela.

== Life history ==
The recorded host plants are Cordia cylindrostachia, Cordia bahiensis and Cordia salzmanni.
