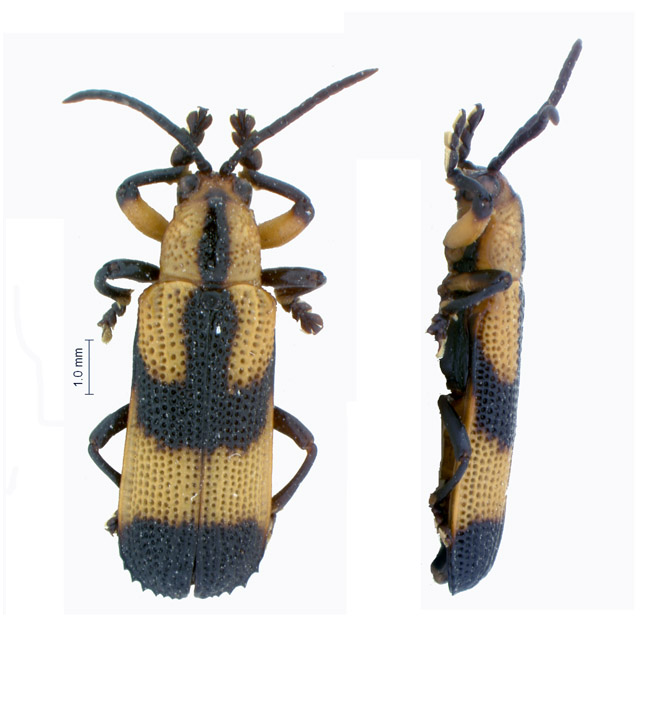

Scientific classification
- Kingdom: Animalia
- Phylum: Arthropoda
- Clade: Pancrustacea
- Class: Insecta
- Order: Coleoptera
- Suborder: Polyphaga
- Infraorder: Cucujiformia
- Family: Chrysomelidae
- Genus: Hispoleptis
- Species: H. subfasciata

Binomial name
- Hispoleptis subfasciata Pic, 1938

= Hispoleptis subfasciata =

Species of beetle

Hispoleptis subfasciata is a species of beetle of the family Chrysomelidae. It is found in Brazil and Peru.

== Life history ==
The recorded host plants for this species are palms, including Astrocaryum chonta and Elaeis guineensis.
