= Estigmena dohertyi =

Scientific classification
- Kingdom: Animalia
- Phylum: Arthropoda
- Class: Insecta
- Order: Coleoptera
- Suborder: Polyphaga
- Infraorder: Cucujiformia
- Family: Chrysomelidae
- Genus: Estigmena
- Species: E. dohertyi

Binomial name
- Estigmena dohertyi Uhmann, 1951

Species of beetle

Estigmena dohertyi is a species of beetle in the family Chrysomelidae. It is found in Myanmar.
