= Lasiochila angusta =

Scientific classification
- Kingdom: Animalia
- Phylum: Arthropoda
- Class: Insecta
- Order: Coleoptera
- Suborder: Polyphaga
- Infraorder: Cucujiformia
- Family: Chrysomelidae
- Genus: Lasiochila
- Species: L. angusta

Binomial name
- Lasiochila angusta Uhmann, 1954

Species of beetle

Lasiochila angusta is a species of beetle in the family Chrysomelidae. It is found in Malaysia.
