= Lasiochila excavata =

Scientific classification
- Kingdom: Animalia
- Phylum: Arthropoda
- Class: Insecta
- Order: Coleoptera
- Suborder: Polyphaga
- Infraorder: Cucujiformia
- Family: Chrysomelidae
- Genus: Lasiochila
- Species: L. excavata

Binomial name
- Lasiochila excavata (Baly, 1858)

Synonyms
- Anisodera excavata Baly, 1858; Anisoderopsis alternata Maulik, 1919; Lasiochila rufipes Pic, 1924

Species of beetle

Lasiochila excavata is a species of beetle of the family Chrysomelidae. It is found in Bangladesh, China (Guangxi, Xizang, Yunnan), India (Assam, Bihar, Meghalaya, Sikkim, West Bengal), Laos, Myanmar, Nepal and Vietnam.

== Biology ==
They have been recorded feeding on Phragmites communis.
