= Deloyala cruciata =

Scientific classification
- Kingdom: Animalia
- Phylum: Arthropoda
- Clade: Pancrustacea
- Class: Insecta
- Order: Coleoptera
- Suborder: Polyphaga
- Infraorder: Cucujiformia
- Family: Chrysomelidae
- Genus: Deloyala
- Species: D. cruciata

Binomial name
- Deloyala cruciata (Linnaeus, 1758)

Synonyms
- Cassida cruciata Linnaeus, 1758; Cassida crux Fabricius, 1781; Coptocycla hamata Boheman, 1855

Species of beetle

Deloyala cruciata is a species of beetle of the family Chrysomelidae. It is found in Argentina, Bolivia, Brazil (Amazonas, Mato Grosso, Minas Gerais, Pará, Paraná, Rio de Janeiro, Rio Grande do Sul, Santa Catarina, São Paulo, Pernambuco), French Guiana, Guyana, Paraguay, Peru, Trinidad and Tobago and Venezuela.

== Life history ==
The recorded host plant is Ipomoea batatas.
