= Hybosispa nitida =

Scientific classification
- Kingdom: Animalia
- Phylum: Arthropoda
- Clade: Pancrustacea
- Class: Insecta
- Order: Coleoptera
- Suborder: Polyphaga
- Infraorder: Cucujiformia
- Family: Chrysomelidae
- Genus: Hybosispa
- Species: H. nitida

Binomial name
- Hybosispa nitida Uhmann, 1939

Species of beetle

Hybosispa nitida is a species of beetle of the family Chrysomelidae. It is found in Brazil (Mato Grosso).

== Life history ==
No host plant has been documented for this species.
