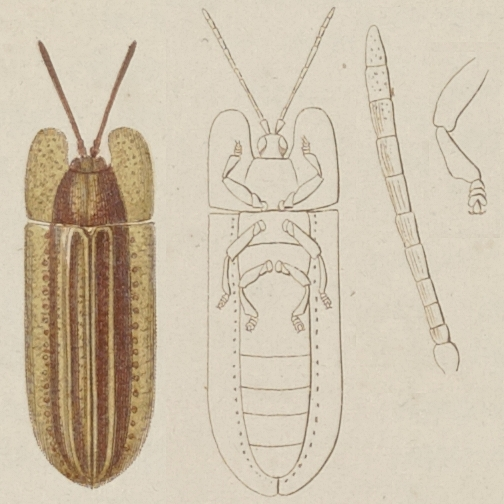
- Delocrania cossyphoides

Scientific classification
- Kingdom: Animalia
- Phylum: Arthropoda
- Clade: Pancrustacea
- Class: Insecta
- Order: Coleoptera
- Suborder: Polyphaga
- Infraorder: Cucujiformia
- Family: Chrysomelidae
- Subfamily: Cassidinae
- Tribe: Delocraniini; Spaeth, 1929
- Genus: Delocrania; Guérin-Méneville, 1844

Synonyms
- Delocrania Dejean, 1836

= Delocrania =

Genus of beetles

Delocrania is a genus of Neotropical leaf beetles, erected by Félix Édouard Guérin-Méneville in 1844. It is the sole genus of the tribe Delocraniini, in the subfamily Cassidinae; species are recorded from the Caribbean, central and South America.

== Species ==
The Global Biodiversity Information Facility lists:

1. Delocrania cossyphoides Guérin-Méneville, 1844
2. Delocrania latipennis Champion, 1893
3. Delocrania panamensis Champion, 1893
