= Solenispa bifoveolata =

Scientific classification
- Kingdom: Animalia
- Phylum: Arthropoda
- Clade: Pancrustacea
- Class: Insecta
- Order: Coleoptera
- Suborder: Polyphaga
- Infraorder: Cucujiformia
- Family: Chrysomelidae
- Genus: Solenispa
- Species: S. bifoveolata

Binomial name
- Solenispa bifoveolata Weise, 1910

Species of beetle

Solenispa bifoveolata is a species of beetle of the family Chrysomelidae. It is found in Colombia.

== Life history ==
The recorded host plants for this species are grasses (Poaceae).
