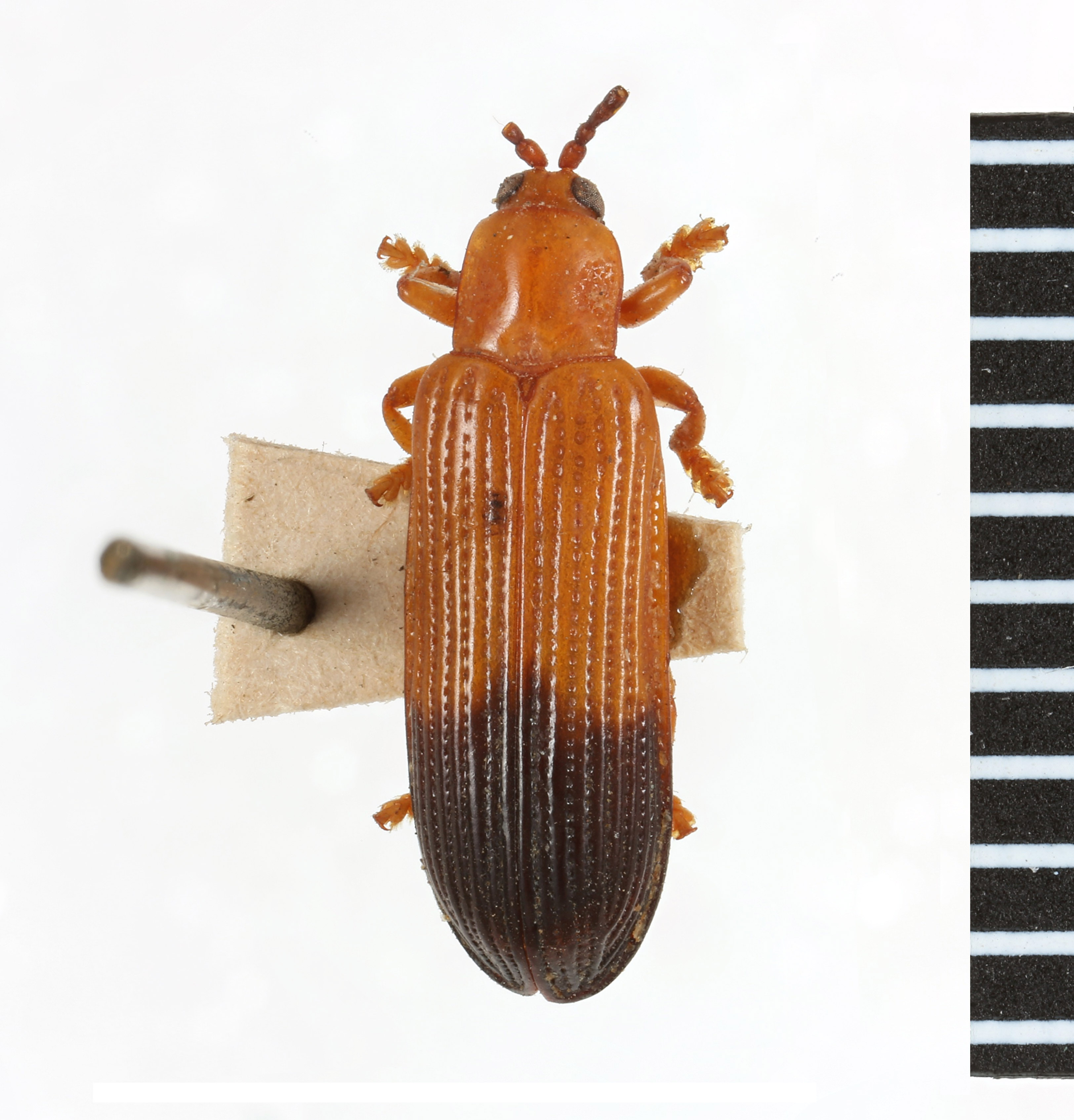
- Estigmena terminalis

Scientific classification
- Kingdom: Animalia
- Phylum: Arthropoda
- Clade: Pancrustacea
- Class: Insecta
- Order: Coleoptera
- Suborder: Polyphaga
- Infraorder: Cucujiformia
- Family: Chrysomelidae
- Subfamily: Cassidinae
- Tribe: Anisoderini; Chapuis, 1875

Genera
- see text

= Anisoderini =

Tribe of leaf beetles

Anisoderini is a tribe of leaf beetles within the subfamily Cassidinae.

== Genera ==
- Anisodera Chevrolat, 1836
- Estigmena Hope, 1840
- Lasiochila Weise, 1916
- †Protanisodera Quiel, 1909
  - † Protanisodera glaesi Quiel 1909, described from Baltic amber.
