= Lasiochila jitrana =

Scientific classification
- Kingdom: Animalia
- Phylum: Arthropoda
- Class: Insecta
- Order: Coleoptera
- Suborder: Polyphaga
- Infraorder: Cucujiformia
- Family: Chrysomelidae
- Genus: Lasiochila
- Species: L. jitrana

Binomial name
- Lasiochila jitrana Uhmann, 1954

Species of beetle

Lasiochila jitrana is a species of beetle of the family Chrysomelidae. It is found in Malaysia.
