= Hispoleptis ollagnieri =

Scientific classification
- Kingdom: Animalia
- Phylum: Arthropoda
- Clade: Pancrustacea
- Class: Insecta
- Order: Coleoptera
- Suborder: Polyphaga
- Infraorder: Cucujiformia
- Family: Chrysomelidae
- Genus: Hispoleptis
- Species: H. ollagnieri

Binomial name
- Hispoleptis ollagnieri Berti & Chenon, 1973

Species of beetle

Hispoleptis ollagnieri is a species of beetle of the family Chrysomelidae. It is found in Colombia.

== Life history ==
The recorded host plants for this species are palms, including Elaeis guineensis.
