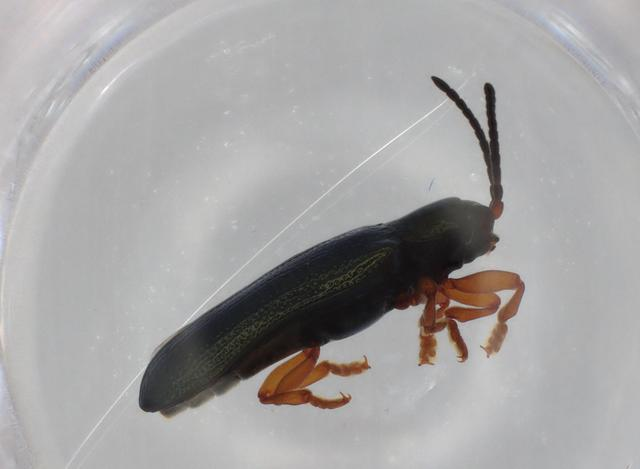

Scientific classification
- Kingdom: Animalia
- Phylum: Arthropoda
- Clade: Pancrustacea
- Class: Insecta
- Order: Coleoptera
- Suborder: Polyphaga
- Infraorder: Cucujiformia
- Family: Chrysomelidae
- Genus: Solenispa
- Species: S. leptomorpha

Binomial name
- Solenispa leptomorpha (Baly, 1885)

Synonyms
- Cephaloleia leptomorpha Baly, 1885

= Solenispa leptomorpha =

Species of beetle

Solenispa leptomorpha is a species of beetle of the family Chrysomelidae. It is found in Costa Rica and Panama.

== Life history ==
No host plant has been documented for this species.
