= Dorynotini =

- Dorynota electa

Scientific classification
- Kingdom: Animalia
- Phylum: Arthropoda
- Clade: Pancrustacea
- Class: Insecta
- Order: Coleoptera
- Suborder: Polyphaga
- Infraorder: Cucujiformia
- Family: Chrysomelidae
- Subfamily: Cassidinae
- Tribe: Dorynotini; Monrós & Viana, 1949

Genera
- see text

Synonyms
- Batonotini Spaeth, 1923

Tribe of leaf beetles

Dorynotini is a tribe of leaf beetles within the subfamily Cassidinae; species are recorded from central and South America.

== Genera ==
As of September 2026, the Global Biodiversity Information Facility includes:

1. Dorynota Chevrolat in Dejean, 1836
2. Heteronychocassis Spaeth, 1915
3. Omoteina Chevrolat in Dejean, 1836
4. Paranota Monrós & Viana, 1949
5. Paratrikona Spaeth, 1923
