= Lasiochila mediovittata =

Scientific classification
- Kingdom: Animalia
- Phylum: Arthropoda
- Class: Insecta
- Order: Coleoptera
- Suborder: Polyphaga
- Infraorder: Cucujiformia
- Family: Chrysomelidae
- Genus: Lasiochila
- Species: L. mediovittata

Binomial name
- Lasiochila mediovittata (Gestro, 1920)

Synonyms
- Anisoderopsis mediovittata Gestro, 1920

Species of beetle

Lasiochila mediovittata is a species of beetle of the family Chrysomelidae. It is found in Vietnam.
