= Lasiochila nasuellii =

Scientific classification
- Kingdom: Animalia
- Phylum: Arthropoda
- Class: Insecta
- Order: Coleoptera
- Suborder: Polyphaga
- Infraorder: Cucujiformia
- Family: Chrysomelidae
- Genus: Lasiochila
- Species: L. nasuellii

Binomial name
- Lasiochila nasuellii (Gestro, 1890)

Synonyms
- Anisodera nasuellii Gestro, 1890

Species of beetle

Lasiochila nasuellii is a species of beetle of the family Chrysomelidae. It is found in Myanmar.
