= Goniochenia parvula =

Scientific classification
- Kingdom: Animalia
- Phylum: Arthropoda
- Clade: Pancrustacea
- Class: Insecta
- Order: Coleoptera
- Suborder: Polyphaga
- Infraorder: Cucujiformia
- Family: Chrysomelidae
- Genus: Goniochenia
- Species: G. parvula

Binomial name
- Goniochenia parvula Weise, 1896

Species of beetle

Goniochenia parvula is a species of beetle of the family Chrysomelidae. It is found in Brazil (Pernambuco, Rio de Janeiro, São Paulo).
