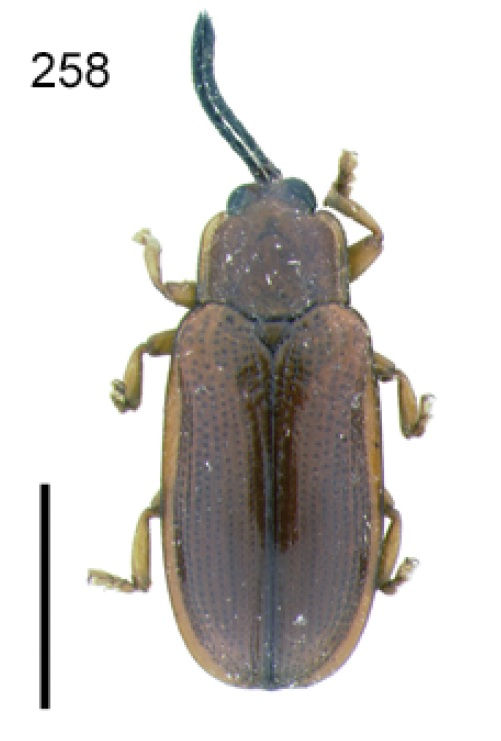
- This image might in fact represent a different Cephaloleia species

Scientific classification
- Kingdom: Animalia
- Phylum: Arthropoda
- Class: Insecta
- Order: Coleoptera
- Suborder: Polyphaga
- Infraorder: Cucujiformia
- Family: Chrysomelidae
- Genus: Hybosispa
- Species: H. truncatipennis

Binomial name
- Hybosispa truncatipennis (Baly, 1869)

Synonyms
- Cephaloleia truncatipennis Baly, 1869

= Hybosispa truncatipennis =

Species of beetle

Hybosispa truncatipennis is a species of beetle of the family Chrysomelidae. It is found in Brazil (Amazonas) and Peru.

== Description ==
Adults reach a length of about 5.7 mm. Although redescribed in detail in a genus revision published in 2014, another researcher questions this redescription, stating that the specimen used for the description was misidentified and actually belongs to another species of Cephaloleia.
