= Lasiochila rufa =

Scientific classification
- Kingdom: Animalia
- Phylum: Arthropoda
- Clade: Pancrustacea
- Class: Insecta
- Order: Coleoptera
- Suborder: Polyphaga
- Infraorder: Cucujiformia
- Family: Chrysomelidae
- Genus: Lasiochila
- Species: L. rufa

Binomial name
- Lasiochila rufa (Guérin-Méneville, 1840)

Synonyms
- Bothryonopa rufa Guérin-Méneville, 1840

Species of beetle

Lasiochila rufa is a species of beetle of the family Chrysomelidae. It is found in Indonesia (Java), Myanmar and Vietnam.

== Biology ==
They have been recorded feeding on bamboo.
