= Lasiochila macilenta =

Scientific classification
- Kingdom: Animalia
- Phylum: Arthropoda
- Class: Insecta
- Order: Coleoptera
- Suborder: Polyphaga
- Infraorder: Cucujiformia
- Family: Chrysomelidae
- Genus: Lasiochila
- Species: L. macilenta

Binomial name
- Lasiochila macilenta (Gestro, 1906)

Synonyms
- Anisodera macilenta Gestro, 1906

Species of beetle

Lasiochila macilenta is a species of beetle of the family Chrysomelidae. It is found in India (Madras).
