= Dorynota bidens =

Scientific classification
- Kingdom: Animalia
- Phylum: Arthropoda
- Clade: Pancrustacea
- Class: Insecta
- Order: Coleoptera
- Suborder: Polyphaga
- Infraorder: Cucujiformia
- Family: Chrysomelidae
- Genus: Dorynota
- Species: D. bidens

Binomial name
- Dorynota bidens (Fabricius, 1781)

Synonyms
- Cassida bidens Fabricius, 1781

Species of beetle

Dorynota bidens is a species of beetle of the family Chrysomelidae. It is found in Brazil (Bahia, Espírito Santo, Minas Gerais, Pernambuco, Rio de Janeiro, São Paulo), French Guiana, Paraguay and Trinidad and Tobago.

== Life history ==
The recorded host plants are Tabebula species.
