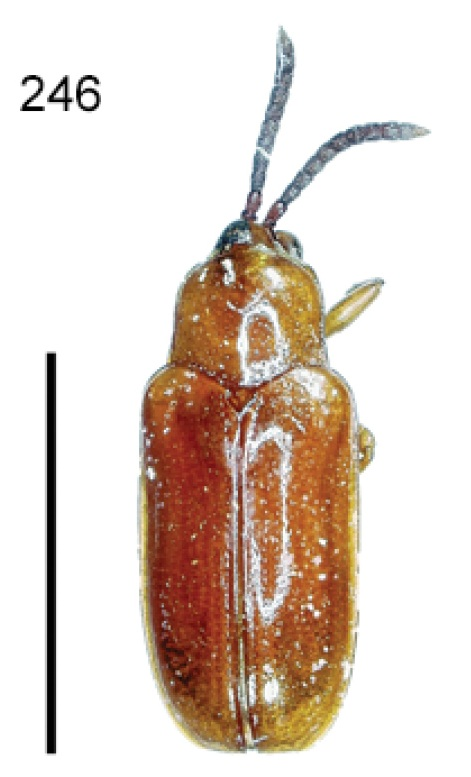

Scientific classification
- Kingdom: Animalia
- Phylum: Arthropoda
- Class: Insecta
- Order: Coleoptera
- Suborder: Polyphaga
- Infraorder: Cucujiformia
- Family: Chrysomelidae
- Genus: Hybosispa
- Species: H. sulciceps

Binomial name
- Hybosispa sulciceps (Baly, 1885)

Synonyms
- Cephaloleia sulciceps Baly, 1885

= Hybosispa sulciceps =

Species of beetle

Hybosispa sulciceps is a species of beetle of the family Chrysomelidae. It is found in Costa Rica and Panama.

== Description ==
Adults reach a length of about 3.6–4.1 mm. Adults are reddish-brown, with the eyes darker. The antennae have antennomeres 1–2 reddish-brown, while 3–11 are black.
