= Lasiochila imitans =

Scientific classification
- Kingdom: Animalia
- Phylum: Arthropoda
- Class: Insecta
- Order: Coleoptera
- Suborder: Polyphaga
- Infraorder: Cucujiformia
- Family: Chrysomelidae
- Genus: Lasiochila
- Species: L. imitans

Binomial name
- Lasiochila imitans Uhmann, 1951

Species of beetle

Lasiochila imitans is a species of beetle of the family Chrysomelidae. It is found in Bhutan, India (Assam) and Nepal.

== Biology ==
They have been recorded feeding on Dendrocalamus species.
