= Hispoleptis diluta =

Scientific classification
- Kingdom: Animalia
- Phylum: Arthropoda
- Clade: Pancrustacea
- Class: Insecta
- Order: Coleoptera
- Suborder: Polyphaga
- Infraorder: Cucujiformia
- Family: Chrysomelidae
- Genus: Hispoleptis
- Species: H. diluta

Binomial name
- Hispoleptis diluta (Guérin-Méneville, 1840)

Synonyms
- Promecotheca diluta Guérin-Méneville, 1840; Hispoleptis diluta obscuripes Weise, 1921

Species of beetle

Hispoleptis diluta is a species of beetle of the family Chrysomelidae. It is found in Bolivia, Brazil (Amazonas), French Guiana and Suriname.

== Life history ==
The recorded host plants for this species are palms, including Elaeis guineensis.
