= Lasiochila latior =

Scientific classification
- Kingdom: Animalia
- Phylum: Arthropoda
- Class: Insecta
- Order: Coleoptera
- Suborder: Polyphaga
- Infraorder: Cucujiformia
- Family: Chrysomelidae
- Genus: Lasiochila
- Species: L. latior

Binomial name
- Lasiochila latior Yu, 1985

Species of beetle

Lasiochila latior is a species of beetle of the family Chrysomelidae. It is found in China (Guangxi).
