= Lasiochila feae =

Scientific classification
- Kingdom: Animalia
- Phylum: Arthropoda
- Class: Insecta
- Order: Coleoptera
- Suborder: Polyphaga
- Infraorder: Cucujiformia
- Family: Chrysomelidae
- Genus: Lasiochila
- Species: L. feae

Binomial name
- Lasiochila feae (Baly, 1888)

Synonyms
- Anisodera feae Baly, 1888

Species of beetle

Lasiochila feae is a species of beetle of the family Chrysomelidae. It is found in India, Myanmar and Vietnam.
