= Paranota =

Scientific classification
- Kingdom: Animalia
- Phylum: Arthropoda
- Clade: Pancrustacea
- Class: Insecta
- Order: Coleoptera
- Suborder: Polyphaga
- Infraorder: Cucujiformia
- Family: Chrysomelidae
- Tribe: Dorynotini
- Genus: Paranota; Monros & Viana, 1949

Genus of beetles

Paranota is a genus of South American tortoise beetles in the subfamily Cassidinae.

== Species ==
Biolib includes:

- Paranota ensifera (Boheman, 1854)
- Paranota minima (Wagener, 1881)
- Paranota parallela Blanchard, 1837
- Paranota spinosa (Boheman, 1854)
