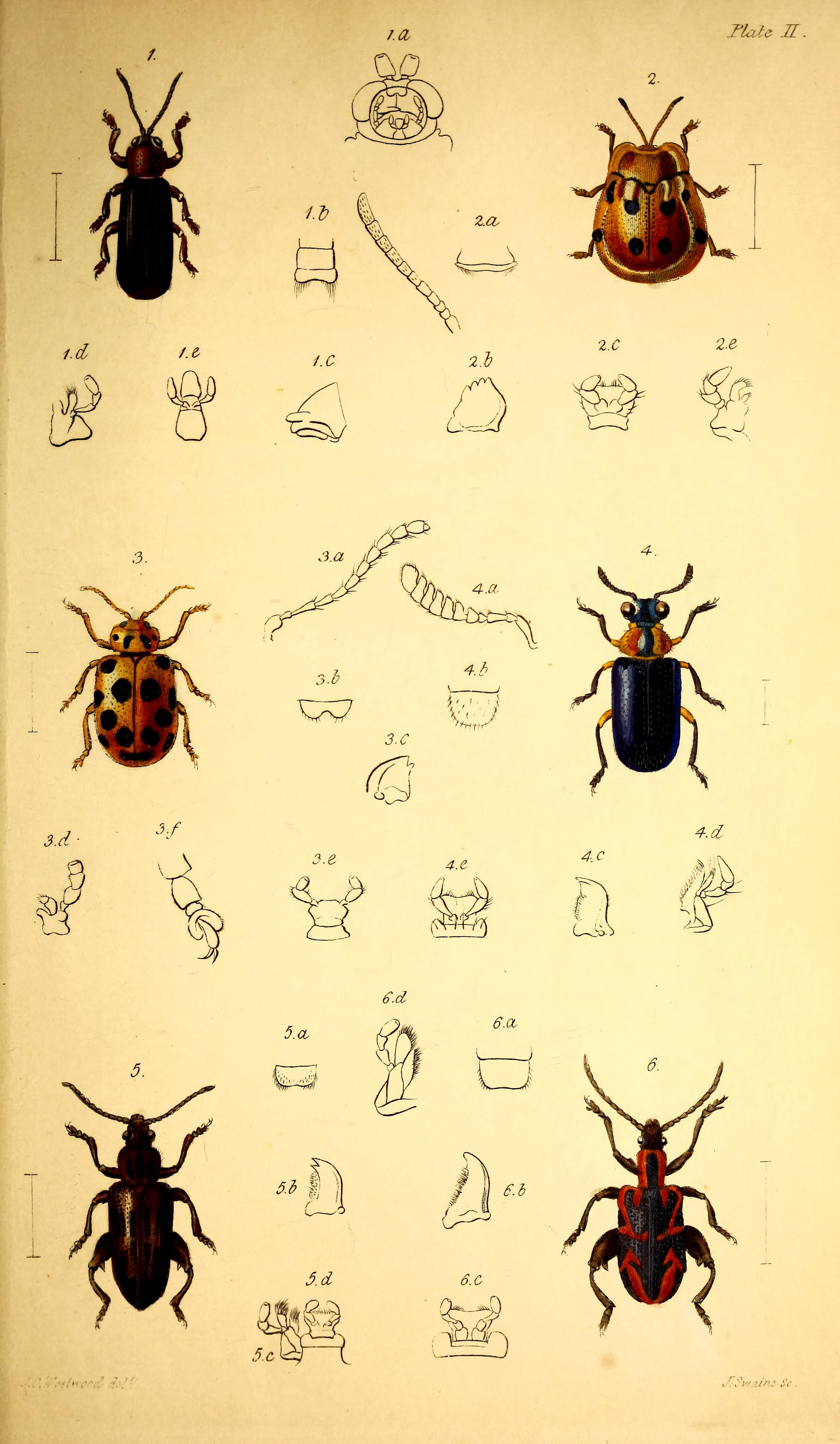
- Fig 1

Scientific classification
- Kingdom: Animalia
- Phylum: Arthropoda
- Clade: Pancrustacea
- Class: Insecta
- Order: Coleoptera
- Suborder: Polyphaga
- Infraorder: Cucujiformia
- Family: Chrysomelidae
- Genus: Estigmena
- Species: E. chinensis

Binomial name
- Estigmena chinensis Hope, 1840

Synonyms
- Estigmena chinensis atricollis Pic, 1924; Estigmena chinensis latior Pic, 1924; Estigmena chinensis nigripennis Pic, 1924; Estigmena chinensis ruficolor Pic, 1924

= Estigmena chinensis =

Species of beetle

Estigmena chinensis, the green standing bamboo borer, is a species of leaf beetle found in India (Assam, Andhra Pradesh, Arunachal Pradesh, Kerala, Madras, Sikkim, Tripura, West Bengal), Sri Lanka, Myanmar, Bangladesh, Cambodia, China (Guangdong, Guangxi, Hainan, Kwangtung), Indonesia (Java, Sumatra), Laos, Nepal, Thailand and Vietnam. It is a major pest of bamboo.

== Description ==
Body length of female is about 14.34 mm and male is about 10.91 mm. Body elongated and parallel sided with blunt and moderate stout. Antennae with 11 segments.

Eggs are elongated with round ends and transparent. Grubs are translucent white. Head, antennae and pronotum are brownish. Eyes and claw tips are black. Anal shield also brownish. Length of final instar grub is about 14.71 mm.

== Biology ==
Host plants are several species of bamboos such as Bambusa bambos, Bambusa wamin, Bambusa nutans, Bambusa tulda, Bambusa multiplex, Bambusa striata, Dendrocalamus giganteus, Dendrocalamus longispathus, Dendrocalamus asper, Dendrocalamus calostachys, Dendrocalamus strictus, Schizostachyum pergracile.

Adults emerge before the onset of monsoon. Adults feed on tender leaves and grubs feed on the culm sheaths and the internodes. After mating, adult female lays about 18 eggs in clusters of 2, 3 or 4. Pre-oviposition period is about 2 days. Egg laying is highest during mid July to August. Eggs are laid on the internodes of leaf axils of bamboo covering. After laying, eggs are covered with masticated fragments of leaves and a sticky secretion. Oviposition period is only one day. Incubation period is about 24 days. Larval period is about 64 days.

Heavy infestations of the beetle on bamboo can be controlled by using contact insecticides such as deltamethrin, cypermethrin and chlorpyrifos as well as systemic insecticides: dimethoate, monocrotophos and imidacloprid.
