= Estigmena cribricollis =

Scientific classification
- Kingdom: Animalia
- Phylum: Arthropoda
- Class: Insecta
- Order: Coleoptera
- Suborder: Polyphaga
- Infraorder: Cucujiformia
- Family: Chrysomelidae
- Genus: Estigmena
- Species: E. cribricollis

Binomial name
- Estigmena cribricollis Waterhouse, 1881

Species of beetle

Estigmena cribricollis is a species of beetle in the family Chrysomelidae. It is found in India (Kerala, Mysore).
