= Hybosispa claripes =

Scientific classification
- Kingdom: Animalia
- Phylum: Arthropoda
- Class: Insecta
- Order: Coleoptera
- Suborder: Polyphaga
- Infraorder: Cucujiformia
- Family: Chrysomelidae
- Genus: Hybosispa
- Species: H. claripes

Binomial name
- Hybosispa claripes (Pic, 1923)

Synonyms
- Solenispa claripes Pic, 1923

Species of beetle

Hybosispa claripes is a species of beetle of the family Chrysomelidae. It is found in Brazil (Rio de Janeiro).

== Description ==
Adults have a uniformly black dorsum.
