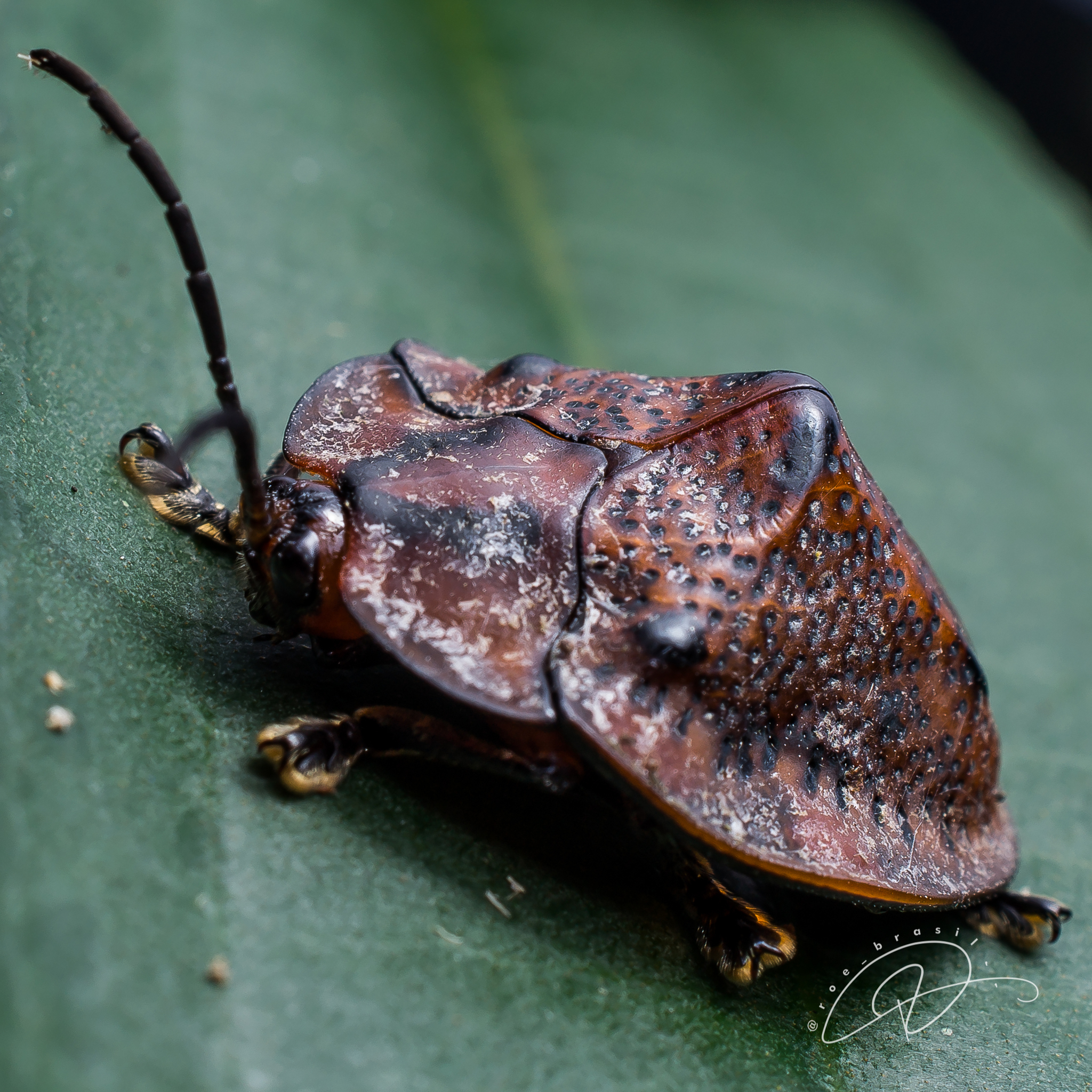
- Cyclosoma fuscopunctata

Scientific classification
- Kingdom: Animalia
- Phylum: Arthropoda
- Class: Insecta
- Order: Coleoptera
- Suborder: Polyphaga
- Infraorder: Cucujiformia
- Family: Chrysomelidae
- Subfamily: Cassidinae
- Tribe: Omocerini; Hincks, 1952

= Omocerini =

Tribe of tortoise beetles

Omocerini is a tribe of tortoise beetles erected by Walter Douglas Hincks in 1952. Species are mostly found in the Neotropical realm, but some may occur elsewhere: for example, the type genus Omocerus has representatives in Africa.

Individuals use plants in the genera Borago and Cordia (Boraginaceae) and Hyptis (Lamiaceae) as host plants. The life cycle of one species has been described.

== Genera ==
BioLib includes:

1. Canistra Erichson, 1847
2. Carlobruchia Spaeth, 1911
3. Cassidinoma Hincks, 1950
4. Cyclosoma Guérin-Méneville, 1835
5. Discomorpha Chevrolat, 1837
6. Omocerus Chevrolat, 1835
7. Polychalca Chevrolat, 1837
