= Hispoleptis =

Scientific classification
- Kingdom: Animalia
- Phylum: Arthropoda
- Class: Insecta
- Order: Coleoptera
- Suborder: Polyphaga
- Infraorder: Cucujiformia
- Family: Chrysomelidae
- Subfamily: Cassidinae
- Tribe: Hispoleptini; Chapuis, 1875
- Genus: Hispoleptis; Baly, 1864

Genus of leaf beetles

Hispoleptis is a genus of Neotropical beetles of the family Chrysomelidae. It is the only member of the tribe Hispoleptini.

== Species ==
- Hispoleptis diluta (Guérin-Méneville, 1840)
- Hispoleptis elaeidis Aslam, 1965
- Hispoleptis ollagnieri Berti & Chenon, 1973
- Hispoleptis subfasciata Pic, 1937
- Hispoleptis sulcata (Fabricius, 1794)
