= Solenispa angusticollis =

Scientific classification
- Kingdom: Animalia
- Phylum: Arthropoda
- Clade: Pancrustacea
- Class: Insecta
- Order: Coleoptera
- Suborder: Polyphaga
- Infraorder: Cucujiformia
- Family: Chrysomelidae
- Genus: Solenispa
- Species: S. angusticollis

Binomial name
- Solenispa angusticollis (Waterhouse, 1881)

Synonyms
- Cephaloleia angusticollis Waterhouse, 1881

Species of beetle

Solenispa angusticollis is a species of beetle of the family Chrysomelidae. It is found in Ecuador.

== Life history ==
No host plant has been documented for this species.
