= Attalea =

Attalea may refer to:

- Attalea (plant), a genus of palms
  - List of Attalea species
- Attalea in Lydia, an ancient city, now Yanantepe in Turkey, and bishopric, now a titular see
- Attalea in Pamphylia, an ancient city, now Antalya in Turkey, and bishopric, now a titular see
