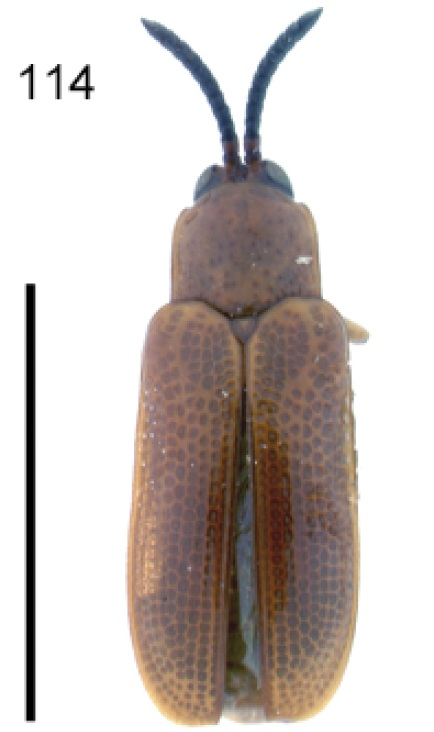

Scientific classification
- Kingdom: Animalia
- Phylum: Arthropoda
- Class: Insecta
- Order: Coleoptera
- Suborder: Polyphaga
- Infraorder: Cucujiformia
- Family: Chrysomelidae
- Genus: Hybosispa
- Species: H. delectabilis

Binomial name
- Hybosispa delectabilis (Staines, 1996)

Synonyms
- Cephaloleia delectabilis Staines, 1996

= Hybosispa delectabilis =

Species of beetle

Hybosispa delectabilis is a species of rolled-leaf beetle in the family Chrysomelidae. It is found in Mexico (Chiapas).

== Description ==
Adults reach a length of about 3.7 mm. Adults are reddish-brown, with antennal antennomeres 3–11 black and the eyes dark.
