= Dorynota cornigera =

Scientific classification
- Kingdom: Animalia
- Phylum: Arthropoda
- Clade: Pancrustacea
- Class: Insecta
- Order: Coleoptera
- Suborder: Polyphaga
- Infraorder: Cucujiformia
- Family: Chrysomelidae
- Genus: Dorynota
- Species: D. cornigera

Binomial name
- Dorynota cornigera (Boheman, 1854)

Synonyms
- Batonata cornigera Boheman, 1854

Species of beetle

Dorynota cornigera is a species of beetle of the family Chrysomelidae. It is found in Brazil (Bahia, Espírito Santo, Minas Gerais, Rio de Janeiro, Pernambuco, São Paulo), French Guiana, Paraguay and Trinidad and Tobago.
