= Estigmena bicolor =

Scientific classification
- Kingdom: Animalia
- Phylum: Arthropoda
- Class: Insecta
- Order: Coleoptera
- Suborder: Polyphaga
- Infraorder: Cucujiformia
- Family: Chrysomelidae
- Genus: Estigmena
- Species: E. bicolor

Binomial name
- Estigmena bicolor Bhasin, 1950

Species of beetle

Estigmena bicolor is a species of beetle in the family Chrysomelidae. It is found in India (Assam).
