= Lasiochila nigra =

Scientific classification
- Kingdom: Animalia
- Phylum: Arthropoda
- Class: Insecta
- Order: Coleoptera
- Suborder: Polyphaga
- Infraorder: Cucujiformia
- Family: Chrysomelidae
- Genus: Lasiochila
- Species: L. nigra

Binomial name
- Lasiochila nigra (Maulik, 1919)

Synonyms
- Anisoderopsis nigra Maulik, 1919

Species of beetle

Lasiochila nigra is a species of beetle of the family Chrysomelidae. It is found in Bangladesh and India (Kerala, West Bengal).
