= Hispoleptis sulcata =

Scientific classification
- Kingdom: Animalia
- Phylum: Arthropoda
- Clade: Pancrustacea
- Class: Insecta
- Order: Coleoptera
- Suborder: Polyphaga
- Infraorder: Cucujiformia
- Family: Chrysomelidae
- Genus: Hispoleptis
- Species: H. sulcata

Binomial name
- Hispoleptis sulcata (Fabricius, 1794)

Synonyms
- Hispa sulcata Fabricius, 1794

Species of beetle

Hispoleptis sulcata is a species of beetle of the family Chrysomelidae. It is found in Suriname.

== Life history ==
No host plant has been documented for this species.
