= Lasiochila goryi =

Scientific classification
- Kingdom: Animalia
- Phylum: Arthropoda
- Clade: Pancrustacea
- Class: Insecta
- Order: Coleoptera
- Suborder: Polyphaga
- Infraorder: Cucujiformia
- Family: Chrysomelidae
- Genus: Lasiochila
- Species: L. goryi

Binomial name
- Lasiochila goryi (Guérin-Méneville, 1840)

Synonyms
- Botryonopa goryi Guérin-Méneville, 1840

Species of beetle

Lasiochila goryi is a species of beetle of the family Chrysomelidae. It is found in Indonesia (Java) and Malaysia.

== Biology ==
They have been recorded feeding on bamboo species, including Gigantochloa scortechinii and Dendrocalamus pendulus.
