= Lasiochila thoracica =

Scientific classification
- Kingdom: Animalia
- Phylum: Arthropoda
- Class: Insecta
- Order: Coleoptera
- Suborder: Polyphaga
- Infraorder: Cucujiformia
- Family: Chrysomelidae
- Genus: Lasiochila
- Species: L. thoracica

Binomial name
- Lasiochila thoracica (Chapuis, 1876)

Synonyms
- Anisodera thoracica Chapuis, 1876

Species of beetle

Lasiochila thoracica is a species of beetle of the family Chrysomelidae. It is found in the Philippines (Luzon, Mindanao).
