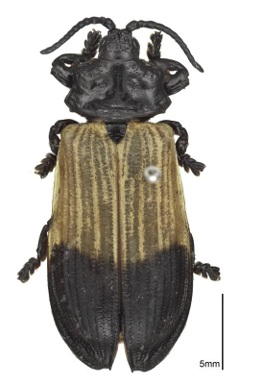

Scientific classification
- Kingdom: Animalia
- Phylum: Arthropoda
- Clade: Pancrustacea
- Class: Insecta
- Order: Coleoptera
- Suborder: Polyphaga
- Infraorder: Cucujiformia
- Family: Chrysomelidae
- Subfamily: Cassidinae
- Tribe: Callohispini; Uhmann, 1960
- Genus: Callohispa; Uhmann, 1960
- Species: C. mirifica

Binomial name
- Callohispa mirifica Uhmann, 1960

= Callohispa =

Genus of leaf beetles

Callohispa is a genus of tortoise and leaf-mining beetles (Cassidinae) with one recognized species: Callohispa mirifica Uhmann, 1960. It is the only member of the tribe Callohispini. It is found in Madagascar.
