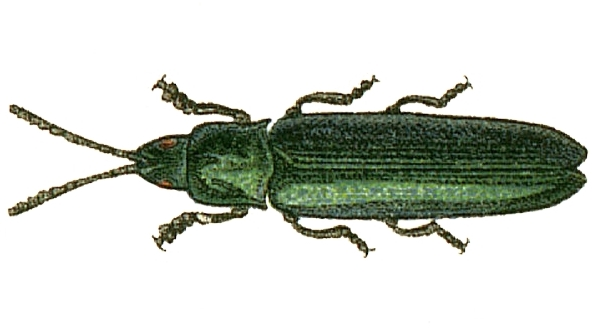
- Leptispa filiformis

Scientific classification
- Kingdom: Animalia
- Phylum: Arthropoda
- Class: Insecta
- Order: Coleoptera
- Suborder: Polyphaga
- Infraorder: Cucujiformia
- Family: Chrysomelidae
- Subfamily: Cassidinae
- Tribe: Leptispini; Fairmaire, 1868

Genera
- see text

= Leptispini =

Tribe of leaf beetles

Leptispini is a tribe of old-world leaf beetles within the subfamily Cassidinae.

== Genera ==
BioLib includes:

1. Leptispa Baly, 1858 - Africa, Europe, Asia
2. Ovotispa L. Medvedev, 1992 - monotypic Ovotispa atricolor (Pic, 1928) - Vietnam

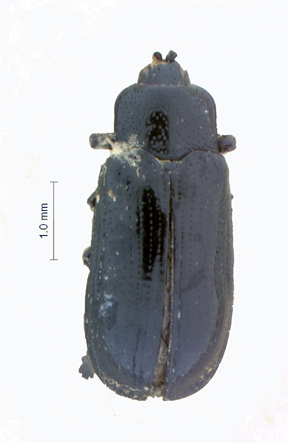
Ovotispa atricolor
