= Lasiochila vitalisi =

Scientific classification
- Kingdom: Animalia
- Phylum: Arthropoda
- Class: Insecta
- Order: Coleoptera
- Suborder: Polyphaga
- Infraorder: Cucujiformia
- Family: Chrysomelidae
- Genus: Lasiochila
- Species: L. vitalisi

Binomial name
- Lasiochila vitalisi (Maulik, 1919)

Synonyms
- Anisoderopsis vitalisi Maulik, 1919

Species of beetle

Lasiochila vitalisi is a species of beetle in the family Chrysomelidae. It is found in Laos, Myanmar, Thailand and Vietnam.
