= Cyclosoma tarsata =

Scientific classification
- Kingdom: Animalia
- Phylum: Arthropoda
- Clade: Pancrustacea
- Class: Insecta
- Order: Coleoptera
- Suborder: Polyphaga
- Infraorder: Cucujiformia
- Family: Chrysomelidae
- Genus: Cyclosoma
- Species: C. tarsata

Binomial name
- Cyclosoma tarsata (Boheman, 1850)

Synonyms
- Dolichotoma tarsata Boheman, 1850

Species of beetle

Cyclosoma tarsata is a species of beetle of the family Chrysomelidae. It is found in Brazil (Bahia, Pernambuco).
