= Solenispa angustata =

Scientific classification
- Kingdom: Animalia
- Phylum: Arthropoda
- Clade: Pancrustacea
- Class: Insecta
- Order: Coleoptera
- Suborder: Polyphaga
- Infraorder: Cucujiformia
- Family: Chrysomelidae
- Genus: Solenispa
- Species: S. angustata

Binomial name
- Solenispa angustata (Guérin-Méneville, 1844)

Synonyms
- Cephaloleia angustata Guérin-Méneville, 1844

Species of beetle

Solenispa angustata is a species of beetle of the family Chrysomelidae. It is found in Colombia.

== Life history ==
No host plant has been documented for this species.
