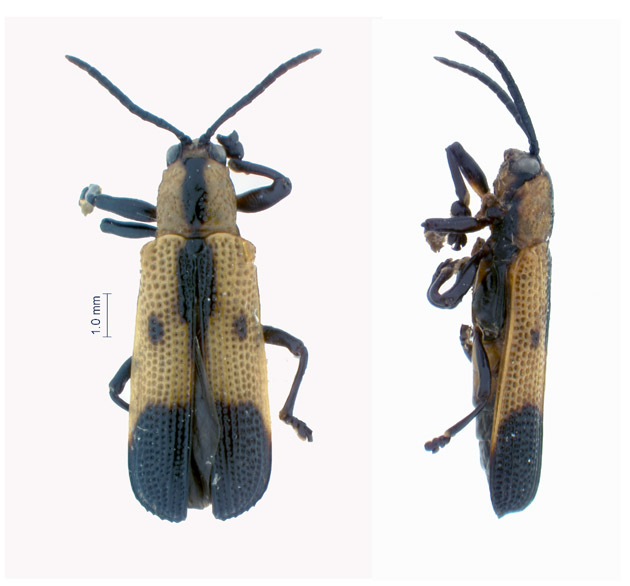

Scientific classification
- Kingdom: Animalia
- Phylum: Arthropoda
- Clade: Pancrustacea
- Class: Insecta
- Order: Coleoptera
- Suborder: Polyphaga
- Infraorder: Cucujiformia
- Family: Chrysomelidae
- Genus: Hispoleptis
- Species: H. elaeidis

Binomial name
- Hispoleptis elaeidis Aslam, 1965

= Hispoleptis elaeidis =

Species of beetle

Hispoleptis elaeidis is a species of beetle of the family Chrysomelidae. It is found in Ecuador.

== Life history ==
The recorded host plant for this species is Elaeis guineensis.
