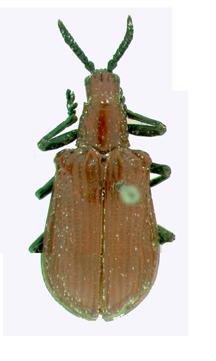

Scientific classification
- Kingdom: Animalia
- Phylum: Arthropoda
- Clade: Pancrustacea
- Class: Insecta
- Order: Coleoptera
- Suborder: Polyphaga
- Infraorder: Cucujiformia
- Family: Chrysomelidae
- Subfamily: Cassidinae
- Tribe: Exothispini; Weise, 1911
- Genus: Exothispa; Kolbe, 1897
- Species: E. reimeri

Binomial name
- Exothispa reimeri Kolbe, 1897

= Exothispa =

Species of beetle

Exothispa is the sole genus of Afican leaf beetles in the tribe Exothispini Weise, 1911.

== Species ==
This monotypic genus contains Exothispa reimeri Kolbe, 1897: a species recorded from Tanzania.

== Life history ==
Exothispa reimeri belongs to the subfamily Cassidinae: the tortoise and leaf-mining beetles, but no host plant records appear to have been documented for this species.
