= Lasiochila cylindrica =

Scientific classification
- Kingdom: Animalia
- Phylum: Arthropoda
- Class: Insecta
- Order: Coleoptera
- Suborder: Polyphaga
- Infraorder: Cucujiformia
- Family: Chrysomelidae
- Genus: Lasiochila
- Species: L. cylindrica

Binomial name
- Lasiochila cylindrica (Hope, 1831)

Synonyms
- Trogosita cylindrica Hope, 1831; Lasiochila apicalis Pic, 1927; Anisoderopsis convexicollis Gestro, 1920; Anisoderopsis krishna Maulik, 1919; Lasiochila mausonica Uhmann, 1930; Lasiochila subparallela Pic, 1924

Species of beetle

Lasiochila cylindrica is a species of beetle of the family Chrysomelidae. It is found in Bangladesh, China (Guangxi, Xizang, Yunnan), India (Assam, Meghalaya, Sikkim, West Bengal), Myanmar, Nepal, Thailand and Vietnam.

== Biology ==
They have been recorded feeding on Bambusa species.
