= Dorynota =

- Dorynota electa

Scientific classification
- Kingdom: Animalia
- Phylum: Arthropoda
- Clade: Pancrustacea
- Class: Insecta
- Order: Coleoptera
- Suborder: Polyphaga
- Infraorder: Cucujiformia
- Family: Chrysomelidae
- Subfamily: Cassidinae
- Tribe: Dorynotini
- Genus: Dorynota; Chevrolat in Dejean, 1836

Synonyms
- Akantaka Maulik, 1916; Batonota Hope, 1839

Genus of leaf beetles

Dorynota is a genus of leaf beetles of the family Chrysomelidae.

== Species ==
- subgenus Akantaka Maulik, 1916
  - Dorynota aeneocincta (Spaeth, 1913)
  - Dorynota biplagiata (Champion, 1893)
  - Dorynota bivittipennis (Boheman, 1856)
  - Dorynota boliviana Borowiec, 2005
  - Dorynota carlosi Borowiec & Takizawa, 2011
  - Dorynota collucens (Spaeth, 1923)
  - Dorynota dejeanii (Boheman, 1854)
  - Dorynota distincta (Baly, 1872)
  - Dorynota electa (Spaeth, 1923)
  - Dorynota exaltata (Fabricius, 1801)
  - Dorynota funesta (Boheman, 1854)
  - Dorynota godmani (Baly, 1864)
  - Dorynota incapabilis (Spaeth, 1923)
  - Dorynota insidiosa (Boheman, 1854)
  - Dorynota kiesenwetteri (Boheman, 1854)
  - Dorynota matogrossoensis Borowiec, 2005
  - Dorynota peregrina (Boheman, 1862)
  - Dorynota rufoornata (Baly, 1869)
  - Dorynota sexplagiata (Wagener, 1881)
  - Dorynota storki Borowiec, 2006
  - Dorynota tenebrosa (Boheman, 1854)
  - Dorynota truncata (Fabricius, 1781)
  - Dorynota viridimetallica Borowiec, 2005
  - Dorynota viridisignata (Boheman, 1854)
- subgenus Dorynota
  - Dorynota aculeata (Boheman, 1854)
  - Dorynota apiculata (Boheman, 1854)
  - Dorynota aurita (Boheman, 1862)
  - Dorynota bellicosa (Boheman, 1854)
  - Dorynota bidens (Fabricius, 1781) - type species
  - Dorynota cornigera (Boheman, 1854)
  - Dorynota hastifera (Spaeth, 1923)
  - Dorynota monoceros (Germar, 1824)
  - Dorynota nigra (Boheman, 1856)
  - Dorynota nodosa (Boheman, 1854)
  - Dorynota ohausi (Spaeth, 1915)
  - Dorynota pubescens (Blake, 1939)
  - Dorynota pugionata (Germar, 1824)
  - Dorynota rileyi Borowiec, 1994
  - Dorynota rufomarginata (Wagener, 1881)
  - Dorynota yucatana (Champion, 1893)
