= Chlamydocassis =

- Chlamydocassis laticollis

Scientific classification
- Kingdom: Animalia
- Phylum: Arthropoda
- Clade: Pancrustacea
- Class: Insecta
- Order: Coleoptera
- Suborder: Polyphaga
- Infraorder: Cucujiformia
- Family: Chrysomelidae
- Subfamily: Cassidinae
- Tribe: Goniocheniini
- Genus: Chlamydocassis; Spaeth, 1952

Synonyms
- Ceratocassis Viana, 1964

Genus of leaf beetles

Chlamydocassis is a genus of leaf beetles of the family Chrysomelidae.

== Species ==
- subgenus Ceratocassis Viana, 1964
  - Chlamydocassis bicornuta (Boheman, 1850)
  - Chlamydocassis bispinosa (Boheman, 1850)
  - Chlamydocassis laticollis (Boheman, 1850)
  - Chlamydocassis plicicollis (Boheman, 1862)
  - Chlamydocassis subcornuta (Boheman, 1850)
  - Chlamydocassis tuberosa (Spaeth, 1917)
- subgenus Chlamydocassis
  - Chlamydocassis cribripennis (Boheman, 1850)
  - Chlamydocassis intermedia (Boheman, 1850)
  - Chlamydocassis marginiventris (Boheman, 1850)
  - Chlamydocassis metallica (Klug, 1829)
  - Chlamydocassis perforata (Boheman, 1850)
  - Chlamydocassis retusa (Boheman, 1850)
  - Chlamydocassis ruderaria (Erichson, 1847)
