= Goniochenia =

Scientific classification
- Kingdom: Animalia
- Phylum: Arthropoda
- Clade: Pancrustacea
- Class: Insecta
- Order: Coleoptera
- Suborder: Polyphaga
- Infraorder: Cucujiformia
- Family: Chrysomelidae
- Subfamily: Cassidinae
- Tribe: Goniocheniini
- Genus: Goniochenia; Weise, 1896

Synonyms
- Baranosa Weise, 1899

Genus of leaf beetles

Goniochenia is a genus of leaf beetles of the family Chrysomelidae.

== Species ==
- subgenus Baranosa Weise, 1899
  - Goniochenia buckleyi (Baly, 1872)
  - Goniochenia discors Spaeth, 1928
  - Goniochenia elocata (Boheman, 1850)
  - Goniochenia flavosparsa (Boheman, 1856)
  - Goniochenia haroldi (Wagener, 1877)
  - Goniochenia peruviana Hincks, 1956
  - Goniochenia seabrai Viana, 1966
- subgenus Goniochenia Weise, 1899
  - Goniochenia difformis (Boheman, 1850)
  - Goniochenia laticollis (Boheman, 1856)
  - Goniochenia parvula Weise, 1896
  - Goniochenia quadraticollis (Boheman, 1850)
  - Goniochenia tuberculifera Spaeth, 1939
  - Goniochenia virgo Weise, 1896
