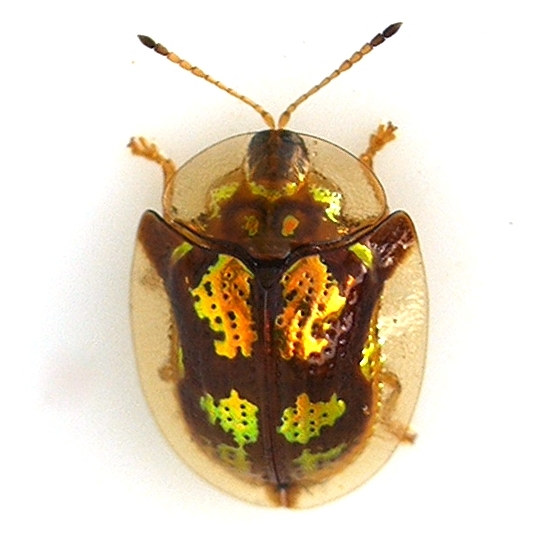

Scientific classification
- Kingdom: Animalia
- Phylum: Arthropoda
- Clade: Pancrustacea
- Class: Insecta
- Order: Coleoptera
- Suborder: Polyphaga
- Infraorder: Cucujiformia
- Family: Chrysomelidae
- Genus: Deloyala
- Species: D. guttata

Binomial name
- Deloyala guttata (Olivier, 1790)

= Deloyala guttata =

Species of beetle

Deloyala guttata, the mottled tortoise beetle, is a species of tortoise beetle in the family Chrysomelidae. It is found in the Caribbean, Central America, North America, and South America.

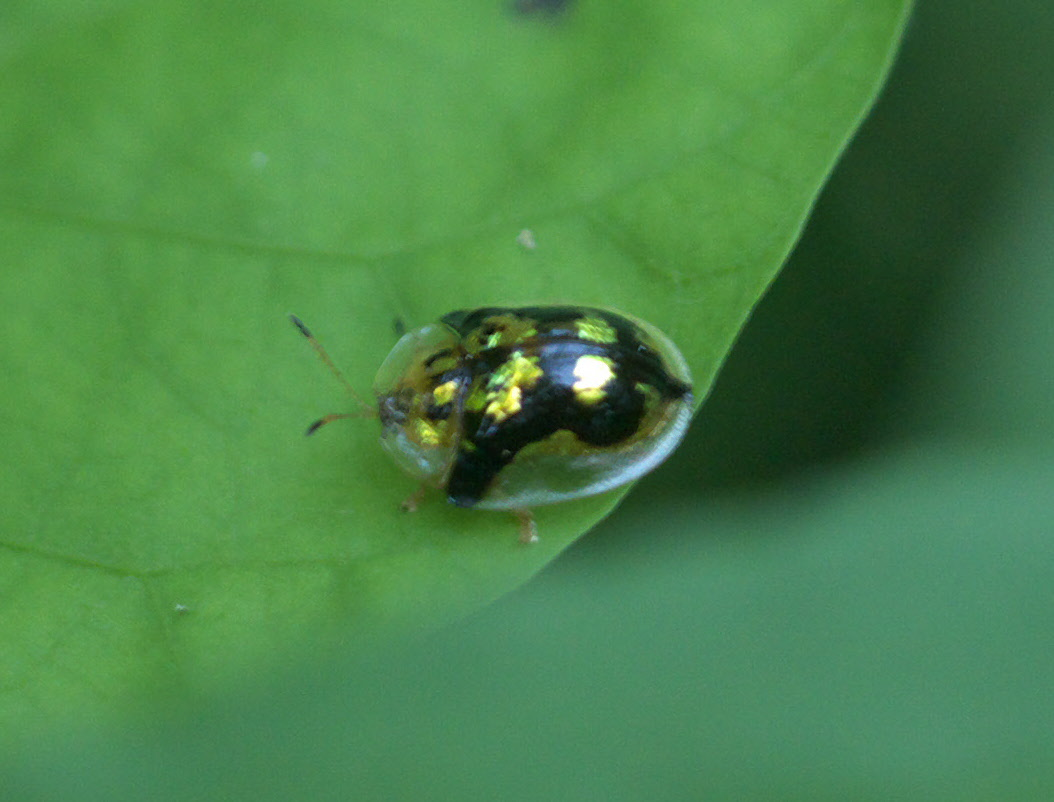
Mottled Tortoise Beetle, Deloyala guttata, Pryor, OK, USA

Larva carry shields made from exuviae and frass on their abdomen that they lift to shield their dorsum from predators.
