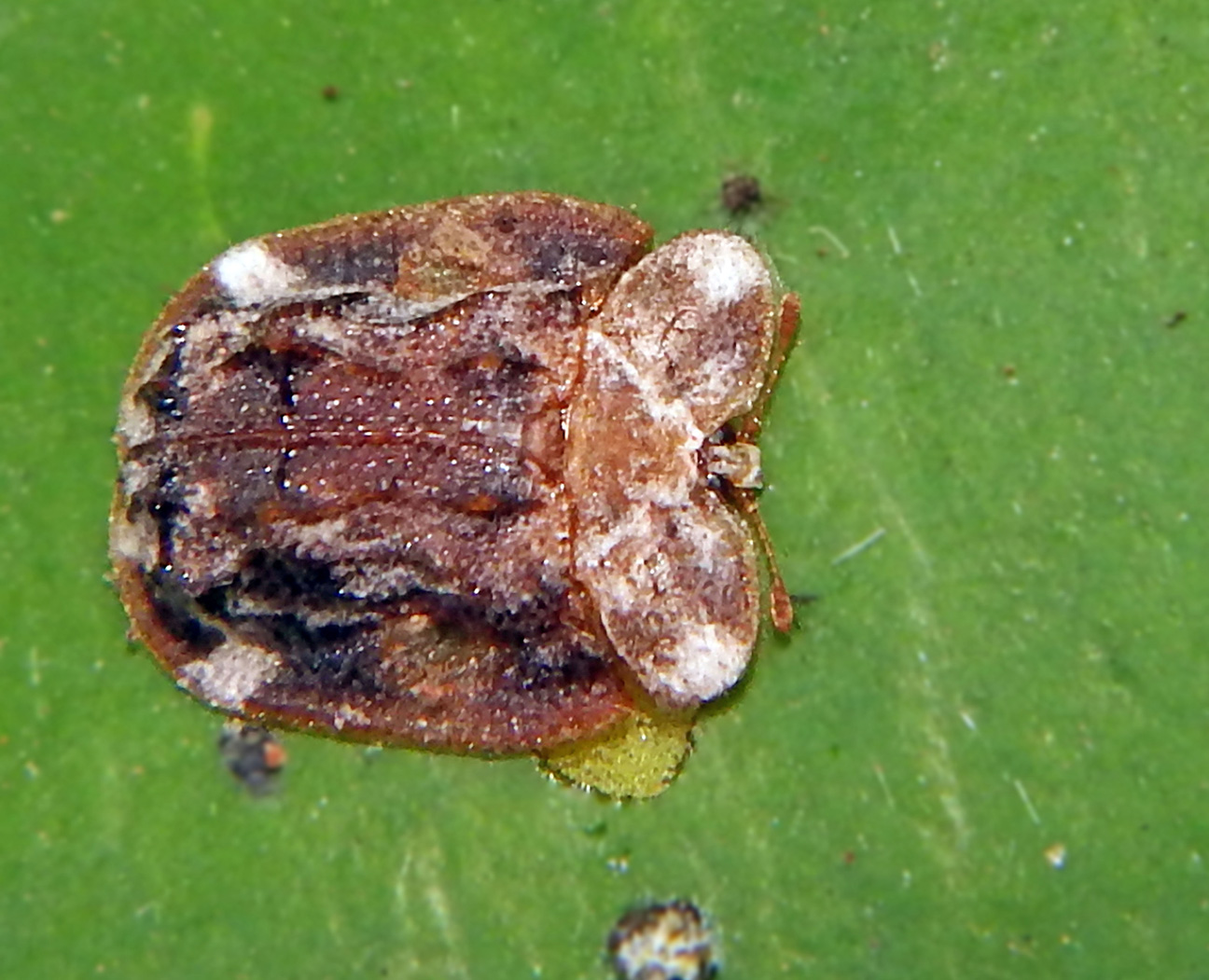
- An unidentified Indian species

Scientific classification
- Kingdom: Animalia
- Phylum: Arthropoda
- Clade: Pancrustacea
- Class: Insecta
- Order: Coleoptera
- Suborder: Polyphaga
- Infraorder: Cucujiformia
- Family: Chrysomelidae
- Tribe: Notosacanthini
- Genus: Notosacantha; Chevrolat, 1837

= Notosacantha =

Genus of beetles

Notosacantha is a genus of cassidine leaf-beetle with nearly 300 species across the Old World and typical of the tribe Notosacanthini. Within Cassidinae, this genus is among the most speciose. They can be very host specific on their host plants. The biology of most species, even the host plants are unknown, but a detailed biology is available for Notosacantha dorsalis. Many species have narrow distributions, especially those from islands in Southeast Asia. Nearly 18 species occur in India and many are difficult to identify from external morphology.
