= Lasiochila bicolor =

Scientific classification
- Kingdom: Animalia
- Phylum: Arthropoda
- Class: Insecta
- Order: Coleoptera
- Suborder: Polyphaga
- Infraorder: Cucujiformia
- Family: Chrysomelidae
- Genus: Lasiochila
- Species: L. bicolor

Binomial name
- Lasiochila bicolor Pic, 1924

Synonyms
- Lasiochila balli Uhmann, 1931; Lasiochila formosana Pic, 1924; Lasiochila insularis Uhmann, 1927 (preocc.); Lasiochila insulana Uhmann, 1929

Species of beetle

Lasiochila bicolor is a species of beetle of the family Chrysomelidae. It is found in China (Fukien, Hunan) and Taiwan.

== Biology ==
They have been recorded feeding on Miscanthus species.
