= Attalea in Lydia =

Historic Roman settlement and current-day diocese

Attalea or Attaleia (Ancient Greek: Ἀττάλεια) was a Roman city of ancient Lydia, former diocese and is presently a Latin Catholic titular bishopric. Its modern location is Yanantepe in Asian Turkey.

== History ==
Attalea was originally named Agroeira or Alloeira. Attalea was important enough in the Roman province of Lydia to become a suffragan diocese of its capital Sardes's Metropolitan Archbishopric, and to mint coins. Yet it was to fade.

== Titular see ==
The diocese was nominally restored in 1933.

It is vacant, having had a single incumbent of the lowest (episcopal) rank :

- Carlo Maria Giuseppe de Fornari (1730.12.11 – ?), as emeritate; formerly Bishop of Aléria (1713.01.30 – 1715.02.20), Bishop of Albenga (Italy) (1715.02.20 – 1730.12.11)

== See also ==
- Catholic Church in Turkey
