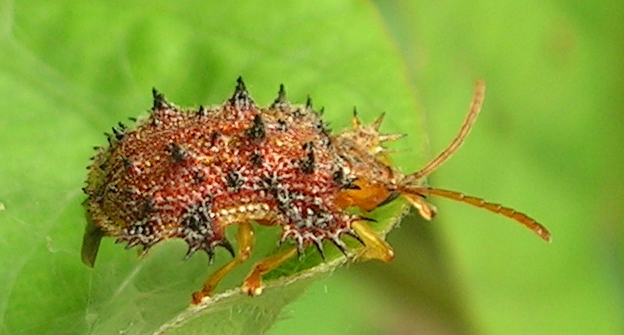
- Platypria sp.

Scientific classification
- Kingdom: Animalia
- Phylum: Arthropoda
- Class: Insecta
- Order: Coleoptera
- Suborder: Polyphaga
- Infraorder: Cucujiformia
- Family: Chrysomelidae
- Subfamily: Cassidinae; Gyllenhal, 1813

Tribes
- (m): monogeneric: Alurnini; Anisoderini; Aproidini (m); Arescini; Aspidimorphini; Basiprionotini; Bothryonopini; Callispini; Callohispini (m); Cassidini; Chalepini (= Uroplatini); Coelaenomenoderini; Cryptonychini; Cubispini; Delocraniini (m); Dorynotini; Eugenysini; Eurispini; Exothispini (m); Goniocheniini; Gonophorini; Hemisphaerotini; Hispini; Hispoleptini (m); Hybosispini; Imatidiini (= Cephaloleiini); Ischyrosonychini (= Physonotini); Leptispini; Mesomphaliini (= Stolaini); Notosacanthini; Omocerini; Oncocephalini; Promecothecini; Prosopodontini (m); Sceloenoplini; Spilophorini (= Oediopalpini)

= Cassidinae =

Subfamily of beetles

The Cassidinae (tortoise and leaf-mining beetles) are a subfamily of the leaf beetles, or Chrysomelidae. The antennae arise close to each other and some members have the pronotal and elytral edges extended to the side and covering the legs so as to give them the common name of tortoise beetles. Some members, such as in the tribe Hispini, are notable for the spiny outgrowths to the pronotum and elytra.

== Description ==
The "cassidoids" have a rounded outline with the edges of the pronotum and elytra expanded, spreading out to cover the legs and head. They are often colourful and metallic, with ornate sculpturing; a few species have the ability to change colour due to water movements within the translucent cuticle. All members of the subfamily have the mouthparts reduced into a cavity in the head capsule, the legs have four segmented tarsi. The hispoids have larvae that are ecological diverse as leaf miners or cryptic exophagous feeders, while the cassidoids feed freely externally on the plant surfaces. Within cassidoids, the tortoise beetles are diagnosed by the larvae recycling their feces and cast exuviae into a discrete structure held on the caudal processes (or, urogomphi). Fecal shields are thought to provide protection from the sun, wind, heat, predators, parasites, and/or parasitoids though experimental evidence is mixed.

A few species in two closely related tribes (Mesomphaliini and Eugenysini, putative sister taxa) show paternal care of larvae. These species can be viewed as subsocial, with evidence pointing to there being two evolutionary origins of subsociality within this one lineage.

== Taxonomy ==
Cassidinae includes both the former subfamily "Hispinae" (leaf-mining beetles), as well as the former more narrowly defined subfamily Cassidinae (familiar as tortoise beetles) which are now split into several tribes that include the tribe Cassidini, and in all include over 125 genera. The traditional separation of the two groups was based essentially on the habitats of the larvae and the general shapes of the adults. The name Cassidinae for the merged subfamily is considered to have priority.

The former grouping of "Hispinae" (sometimes called leaf-mining beetles, or "hispoids") included the tribes Alurnini, Anisoderini, Aproidini, Arescini, Bothryonopini, Callispini, Callohispini, Cephaloleiini, Chalepini, Coelaenomenoderini, Cryptonychini, Cubispini, Eurispini, Exothispini, Gonophorini, Hispini, Hispoleptini, Hybosispini, Leptispini, Oediopalpini, Oncocephalini, Promecothecini, Prosopodontini, Sceloenoplini and Spilophorini. Most members of these tribes are elongated, slightly flattened beetles with parallel margins, and antennal bases close together on their small heads. They often have punctate elytra and pronotum, sometimes with spines both on and along the edges. The former grouping of Cassidinae (sometimes called tortoise beetles, or "cassidoids") included the tribes Aspidimorphini, Basiprionotini, Cassidini, Delocraniini, Dorynotini, Eugenysini, Goniocheniini, Hemisphaerotini, Mesomphaliini, Notosacanthini, Omocerini and Physonotini.

The subfamily names Cassidinae and Hispinae are both founded by Gyllenhal in the same 1813 book, but following the Principle of the First Reviser, Chen in this case, priority is given to the name Cassidinae.

== Tribes and selected genera ==
The following list of tribes and selected genera has been collated from BioLib and Borowiec & Świętojańska (2014):

- Tribes formerly included in Hispinae:
  - Alurnini Chapuis, 1875
  - Anisoderini Chapuis, 1875
  - Aproidini Weise, 1911Pascoe, 1863
  - Arescini Chapuis, 1875
  - Bothryonopini Chapuis, 1875
  - Callispini Chapuis, 1875
  - Callohispini Uhmann, 1960
  - Chalepini Weise, 1910 (= Uroplatini)
  - Coelaenomenoderini Weise, 1911
  - Cryptonychini Chapuis, 1875
  - Eurispini Chapuis, 1875
  - Exothispini Weise, 1911
  - Gonophorini Chapuis, 1875
  - Hispini Gyllenhal, 1813
  - Hispoleptini Chapuis, 1875
  - Hybosispini Weise, 1910
  - Imatidiini Hope, 1840 (= Cephaloleiini)
  - Leptispini Fairmaire, 1868
  - Oncocephalini Chapuis, 1875
  - †Oposispini Uhmann, 1939
    - †Oposispa Uhmann, 1939
      - †Oposispa scheelei Uhmann, 1939 (Baltic amber)
    - †Sucinagonia Uhmann, 1939
      - †Sucinagonia javetana Uhmann, 1939 (Baltic amber)
  - Promecothecini Chapuis, 1875
  - Prosopodontini Weise, 1910
  - Sceloenoplini Uhmann, 1930
  - Spilophorini Chapuis, 1875 (= Oediopalpini)

=== Tribes formerly included in Cassidinae sens. st. ===
- Aspidimorphini Chapuis, 1875; selected genera:
  - Aspidimorpha Hope, 1840
- Basiprionotini Gressitt, 1952; selected genera:
  - Basiprionota Chevrolat, 1836
  - Epistictina Hincks, 1950
  - Metriopepla Fairmaire, 1882
- Cassidini Gyllenhal, 1813; selected genera:
  - Agroiconota Spaeth, 1913
  - Cassida Linnaeus, 1758 - type genus
  - Charidotella Weise, 1896
  - Chiridopsis Spaeth, 1922
- Cubispini Barber, 1946
  - Cubispa Barber, 1946
- Delocranini Spaeth, 1929: monogeneric Delocrania Guérin, 1844
- Dorynotini Monrós & Viana, 1949; genera:
  - Dorynota Chevrolat, 1836
  - Heteronychocassis Spaeth, 1915
  - Omoteina Chevrolat, 1836
  - Paranota Monros & Viana, 1949
  - Paratrikona Spaeth, 1923
- Eugenysini Hincks, 1952; all genera:
1. Agenysa Spaeth, 1905
2. Eugenysa Chevrolat, 1836
3. Miocalaspis Weise, 1899
- Goniocheniini Spaeth, 1942; all genera:
1. Chlamydocassis Spaeth, 1952
2. Goniochenia Weise, 1896
3. Herissa Spaeth, 1909
4. Polychalma Barber & Bridwell, 1940
5. Zeugonota Spaeth, 1913
- Hemisphaerotini Monrós & Viana, 1951
  - Hemisphaerota Chevrolat, 1836
- Ischyrosonychini Chapuis, 1875 (= Physonotini Spaeth, 1942)
  - Physonota Boheman, 1854
- Mesomphaliini Hope, 1840 (= Stolaini Hincks, 1952) selected genera:
  - Acromis Chevrolat, 1836
  - Chelymorpha Chevrolat, 1836
  - Mesomphalia Hope, 1839
  - Stolas Billberg, 1820
- Notosacanthini Gressitt, 1952
1. Herminella Spaeth, 1913
2. Hermosacantha Borowiec & Świetojańska, 2014
3. Notosacantha Chevrolat, 1836
- Omocerini Hincks, 1952; selected genera:
  - Omocerus Chevrolat, 1835
  - Polychalca Chevrolat, 1836

== Gallery ==
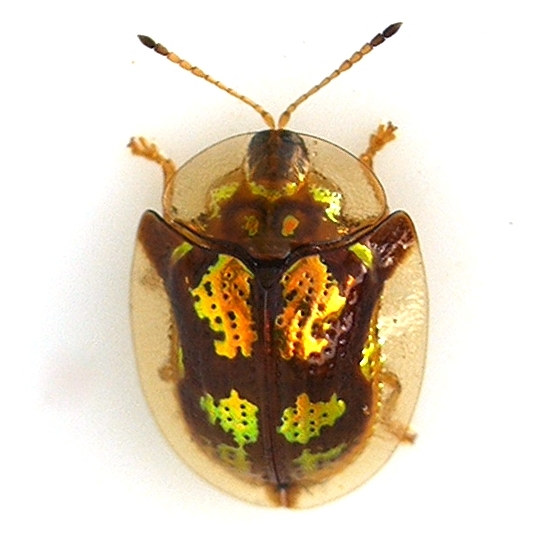
Deloyala guttata, mottled tortoise beetle, showing typical shape and patches of metallic coloration

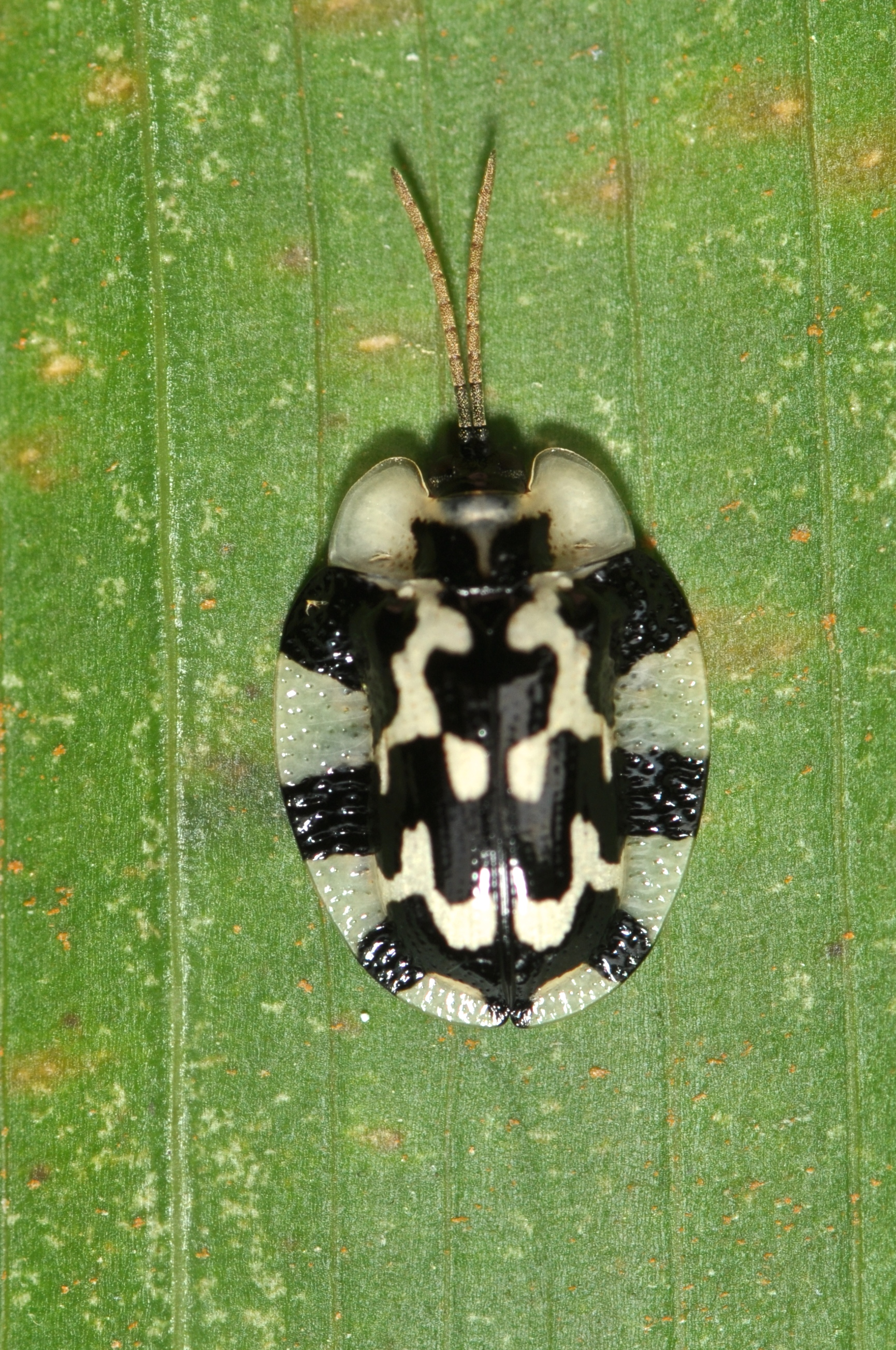
Aslamidium sp.

Hispella testacea in copula (Hispini)

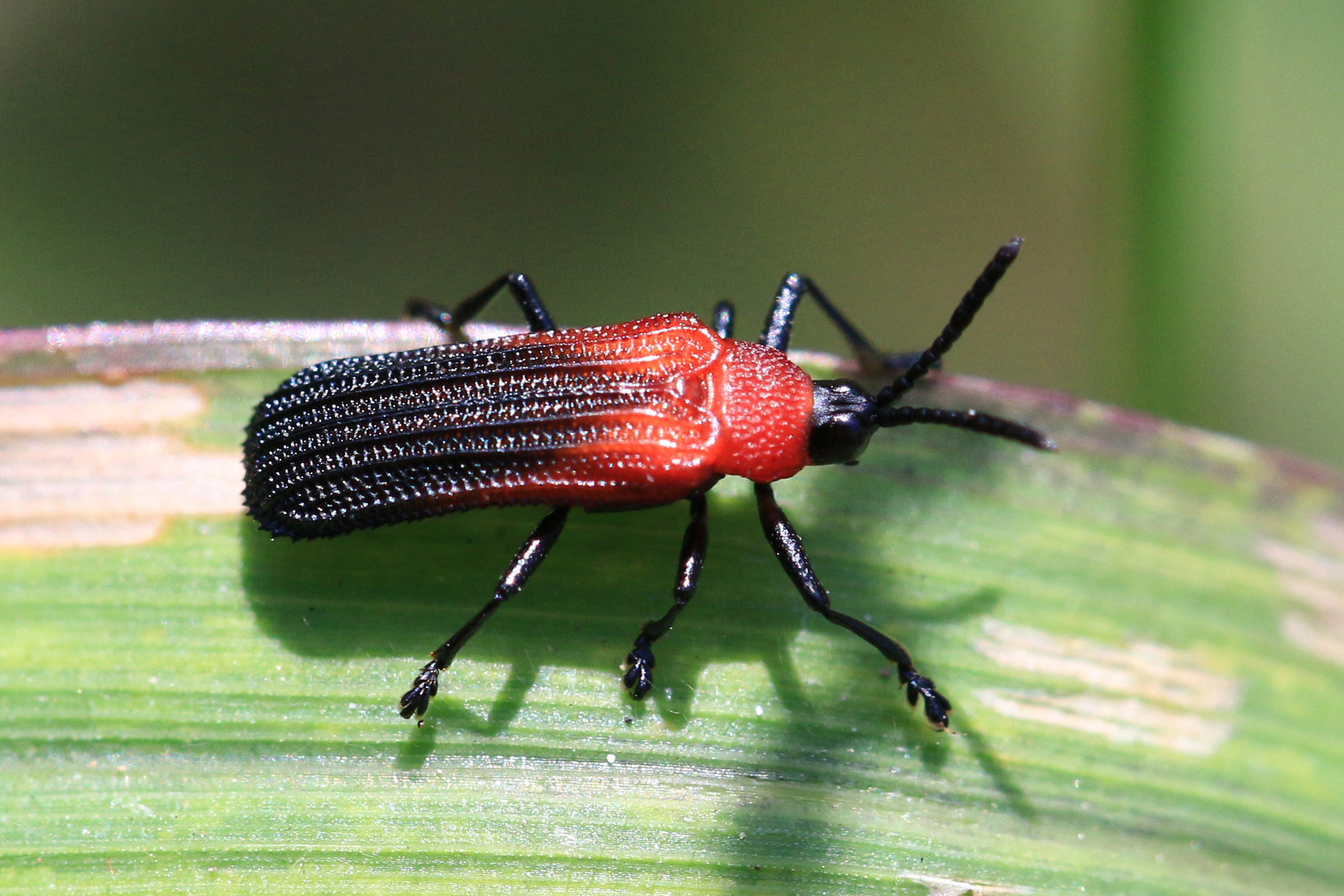
Leaf beetle Chalepus sanguinicollis, Grand Cayman

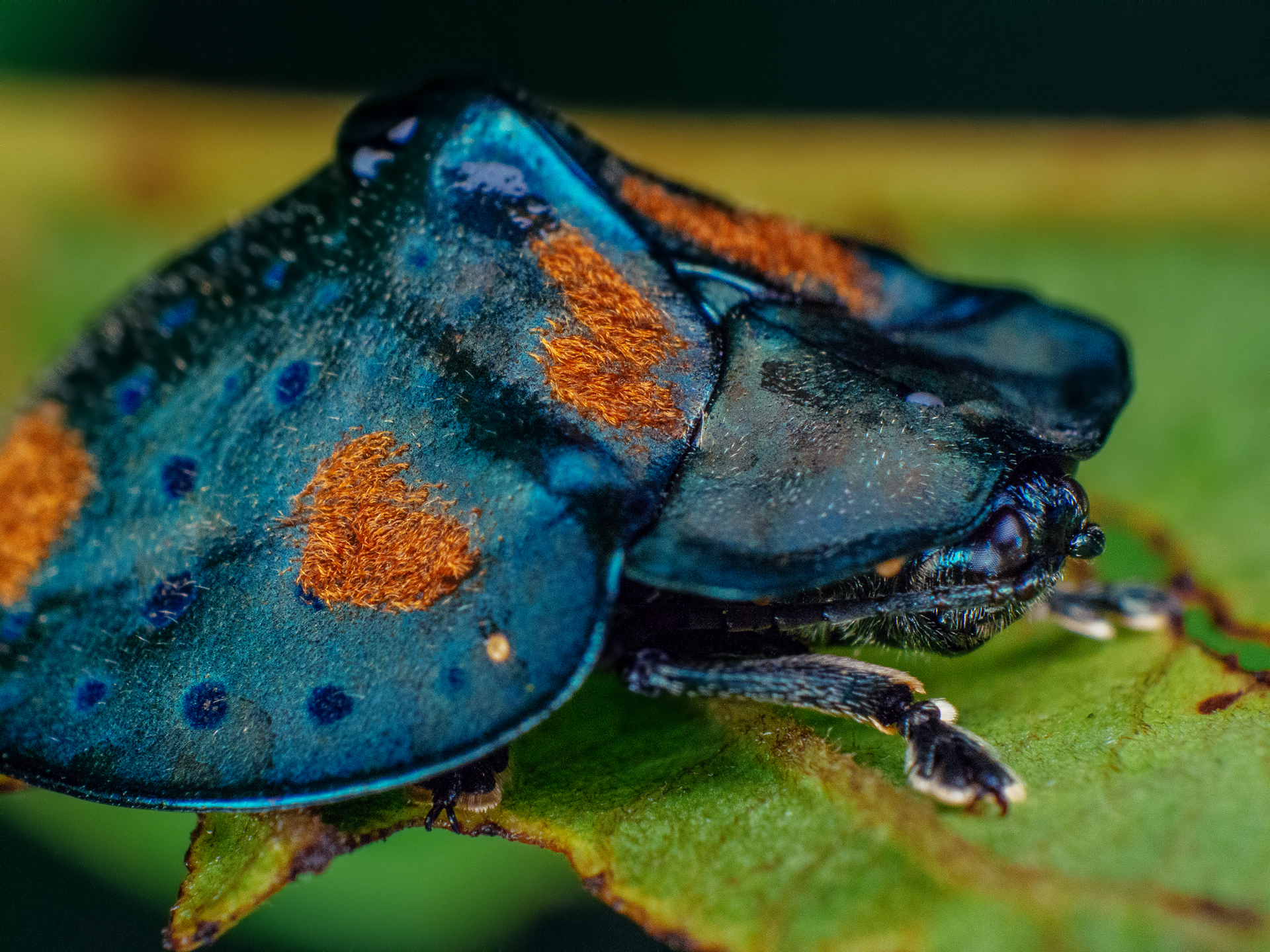
Blue and orange tortoise-beetle Stolas cf. conspersa from Brazil

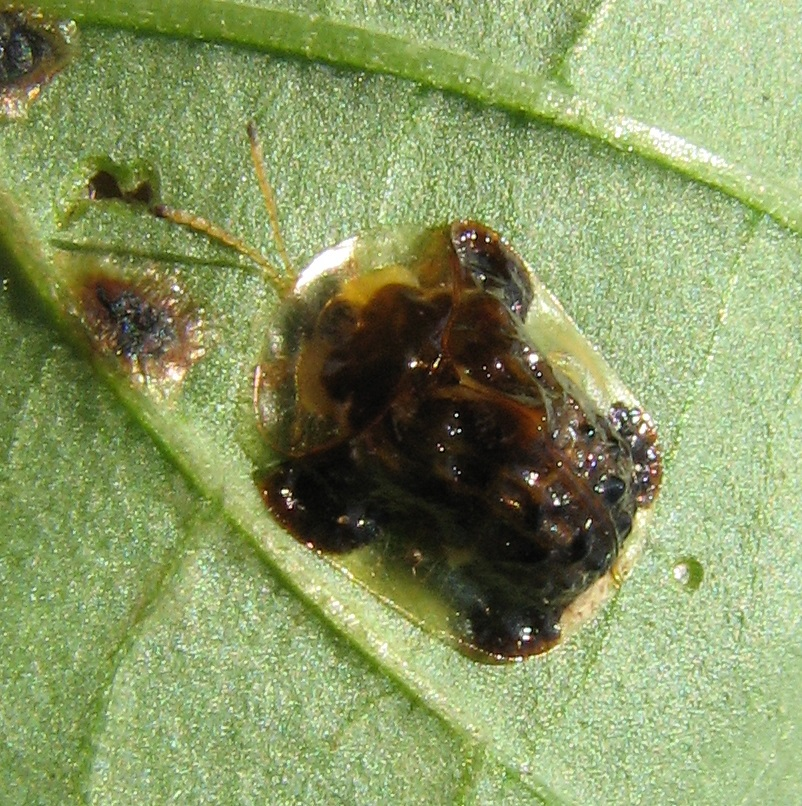
Plagiometriona clavata

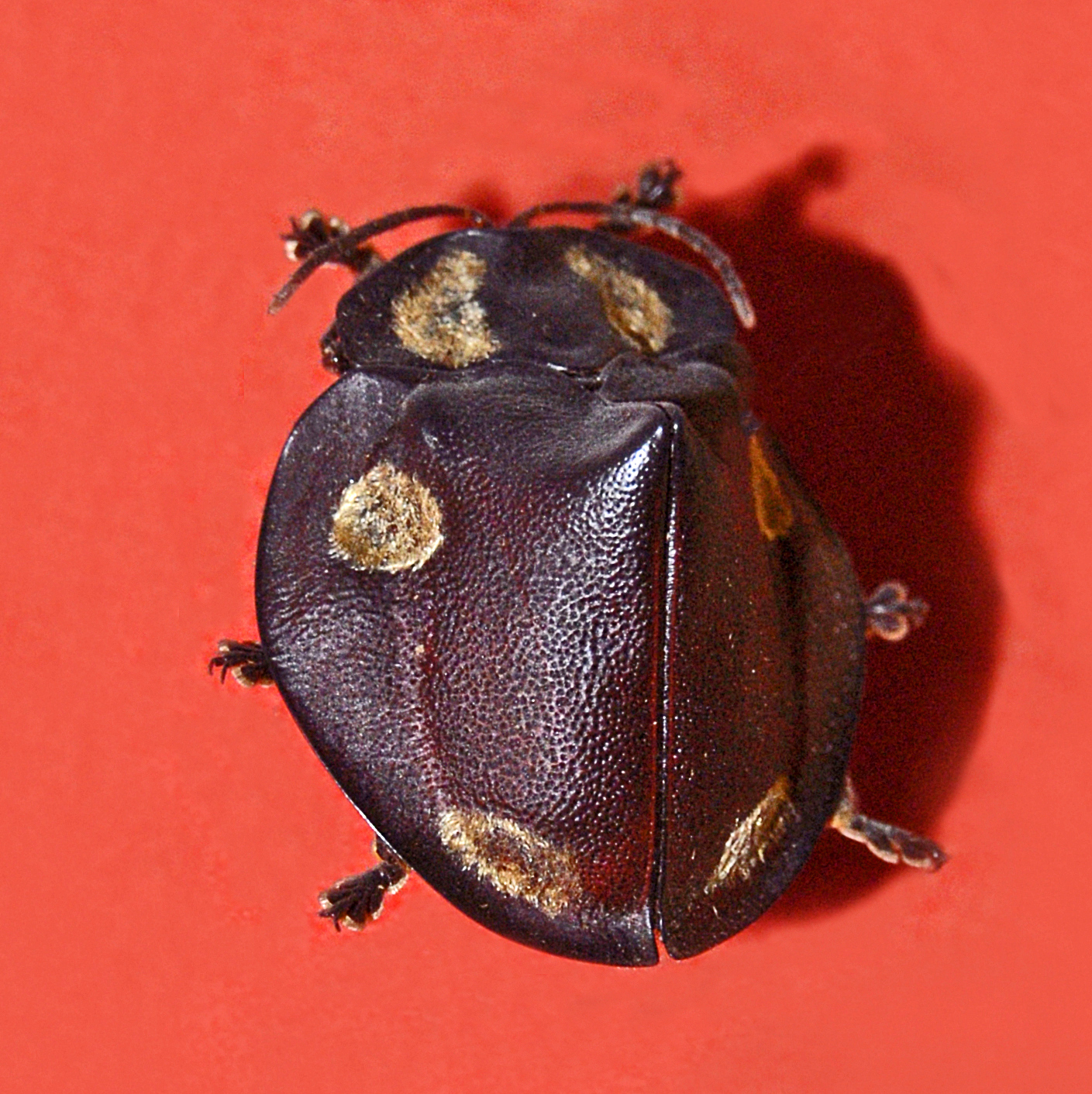
Museum specimen of Mesomphalia turrita (Mesomphaliini)

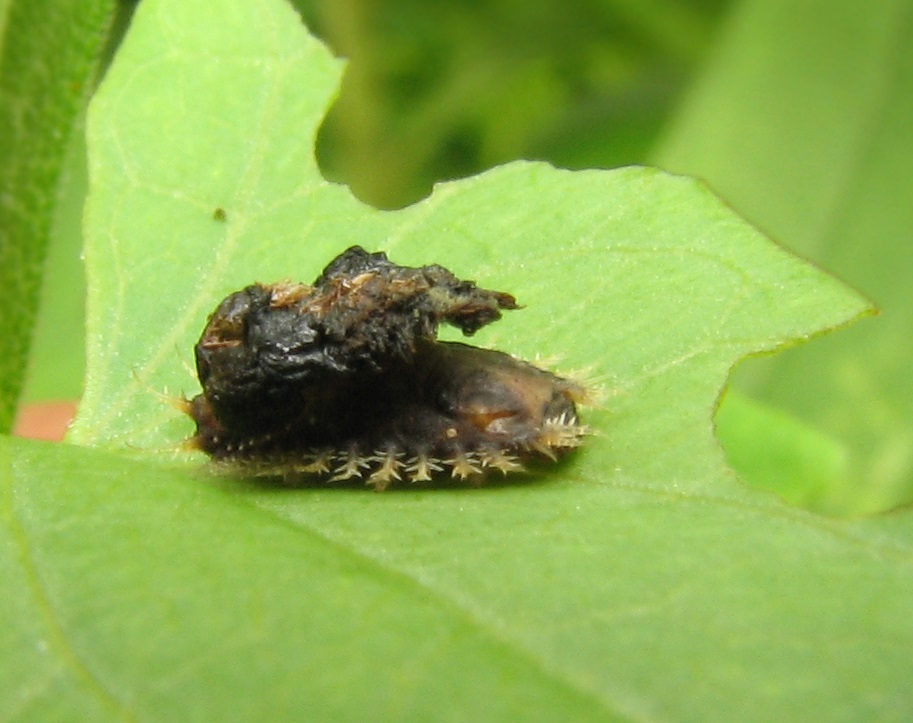
Charidotella sexpunctata, larva protected by fecal shield

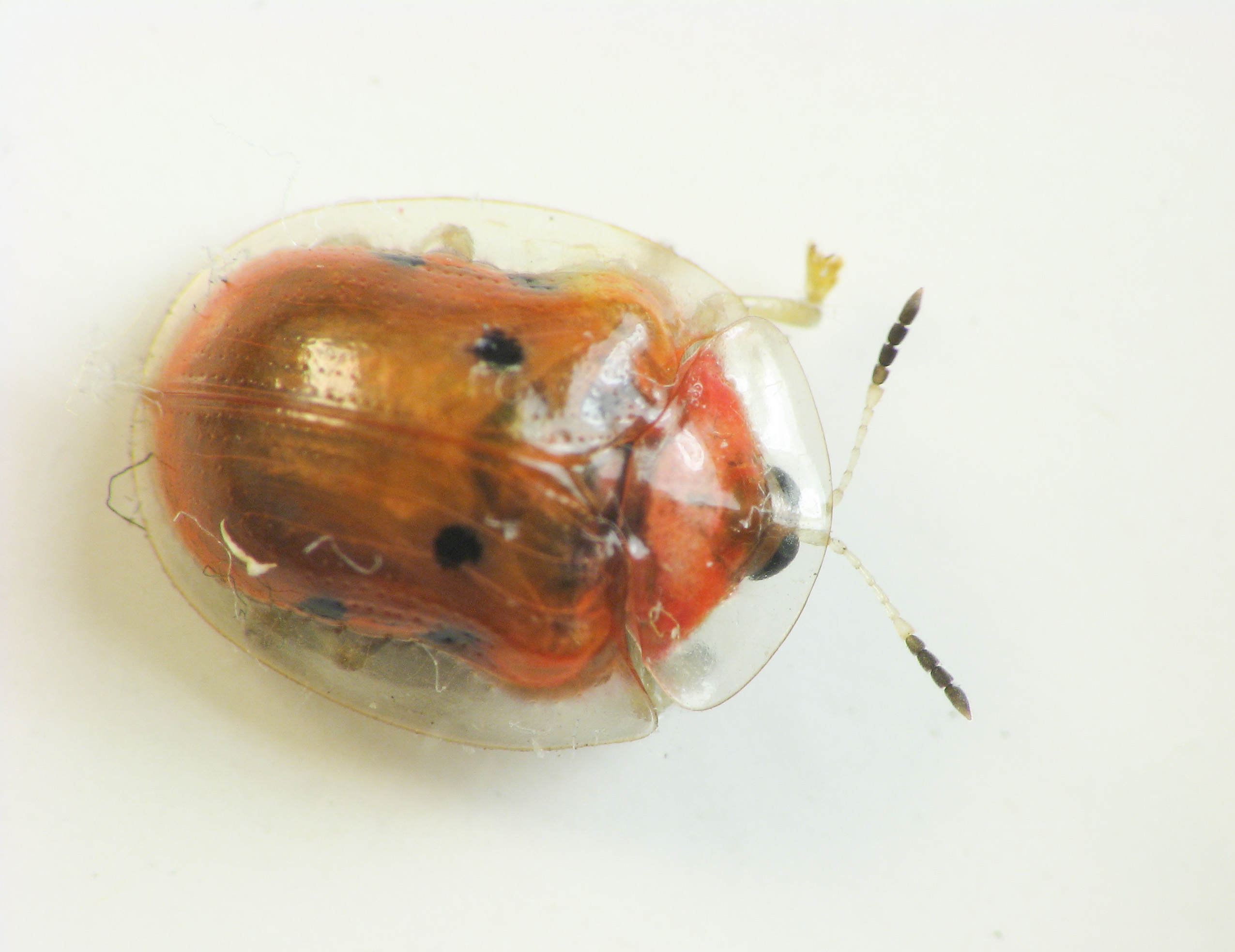
Charidotella sexpunctata, adult

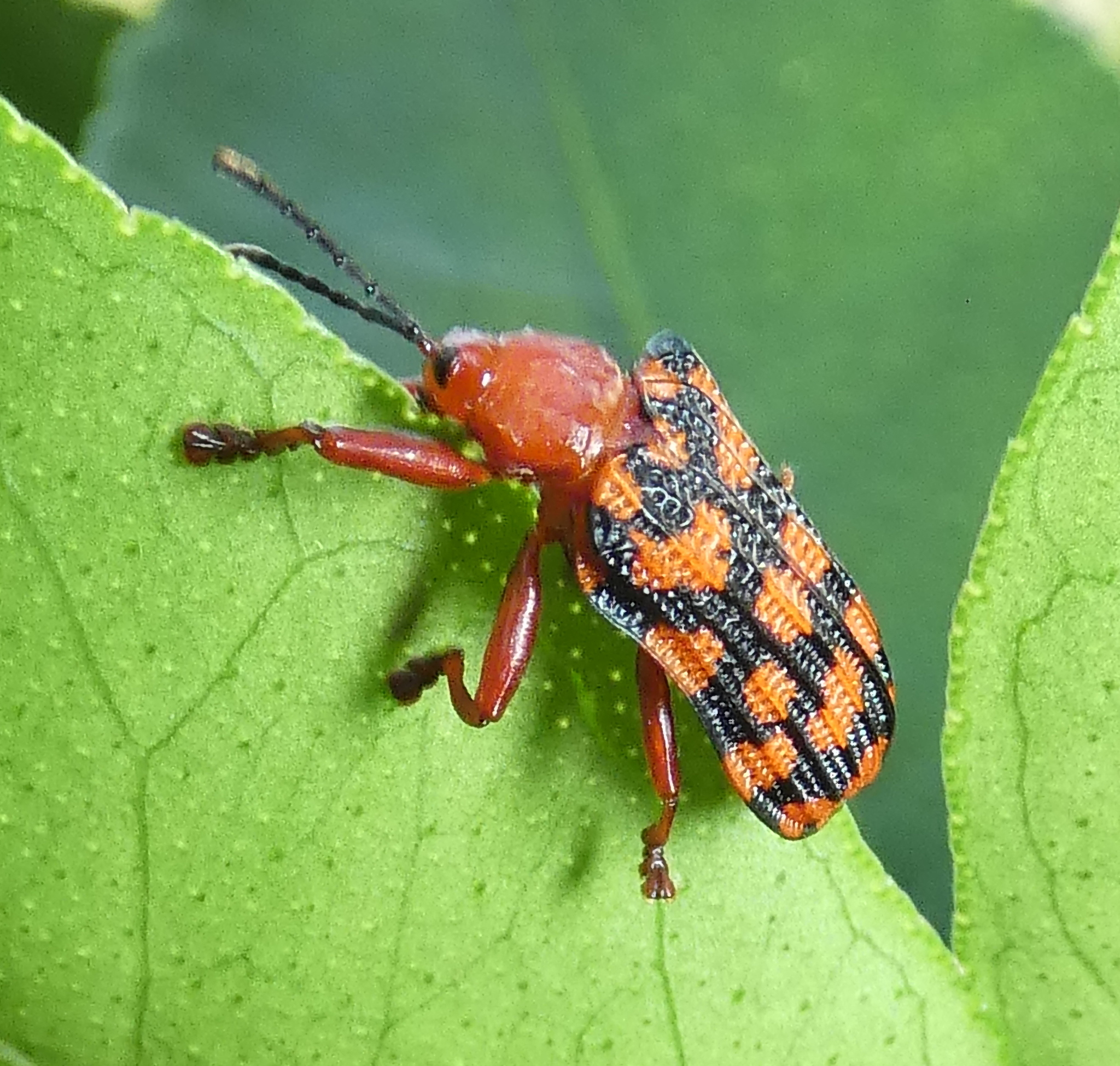
Sceloenopla maculata (Sceloenoplini)

== See also ==
- List of Cassidinae genera
