= Thomas Norris (1765–1852) =

English businessman, art collector and natural historian

Thomas Norris FRAS
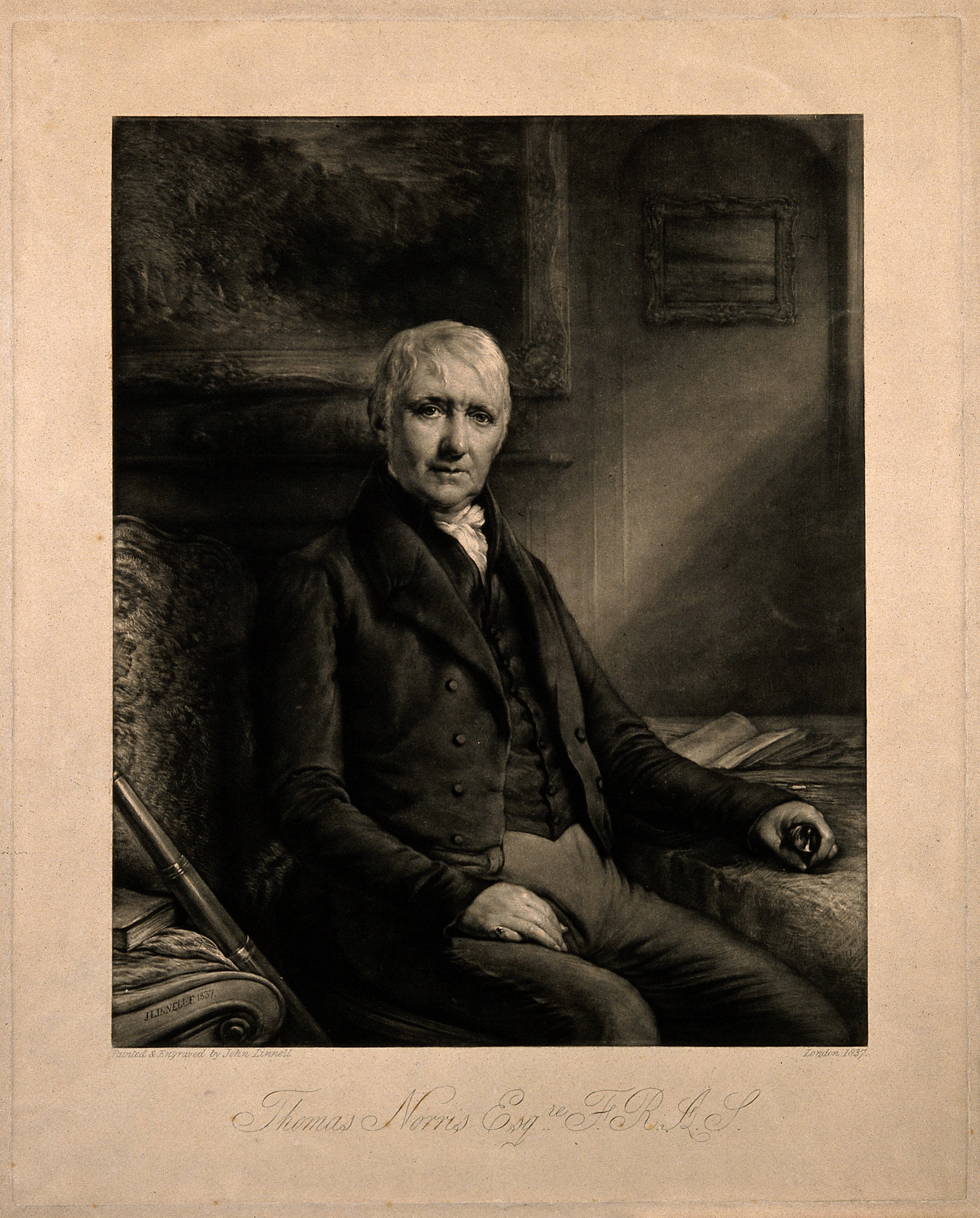
- Thomas Norris FRAS, by J. Linnell, 1837
- Born: 14 January 1765; Croston, Lancashire, England
- Died: 15 March 1852 (aged 87)
- Burial place: St Michael and All Angels, Croston, Lancashire, England
- Occupations: Businessman, art collector, naturalist and astronomer

Thomas Norris FRAS (14 January 1765 – 15 March 1852) was an English businessman, art collector, natural historian and astronomer, born at Croston in Lancashire. Joining the Bury firm of Peel, Yates and Co. as a book-keeper at the age of twenty, he eventually became a partner and amassed a considerable fortune from its success in the textile and calico-printing businesses. Amongst his partners at the firm was the businessman and politician Sir Robert Peel, whose son, also named Sir Robert Peel, served twice as Prime Minister of the United Kingdom. Norris was reputedly a regular and welcome visitor at the latter's home in Whitehall Gardens.

Upon his retirement to Howick House, Penwortham, in 1821, Norris purchased one half of the Lordship of Croston, and dedicated the remainder of his life to artistic and scientific pursuits. In addition to his acquisition of a valuable collection of old master paintings and rare coins, his interest in natural history was reflected by the compilation of an extensive collection of minerals, shells and insects. He was a founder member of the Entomological Society of London (in 1833) and a Fellow of the Astronomical Society of London as early as 1825, continuing as a Fellow of its successor body, the Royal Astronomical Society, from the granting of its charter in 1831 until his death in 1852.

== Taxonomic honours ==
The importance to science of Norris's cabinet of curiosities was acknowledged by leading naturalists of the day, including G.B. Sowerby I, L.A. Reeve, J.O. Westwood, J.B.L. Buquet and F.E. Guérin-Méneville, who between them named various mollusc and insect species in his honour; although a number of these designations have since been deprecated, at least seven remain current: the sea snails Norrisia norrisii (a.k.a. Norris's Top Snail) and Favartia norrisii (a.k.a. Norris's Murex); the land snail Calocochlia norrisii; the ladybird Neda norrisii; the weevil Heilipus norrisii; the tortoise beetle Acentroptera norrisii; and the longhorn beetle Pseudophosphorus norrisii.

== Ancestry ==
A memorial plaque in the Church of St Michael and All Angels, Croston, erected on the occasion of Norris's burial, features a modified version of the coat of arms borne by the illustrious and ancient Norris (or Norreys) family of Speke Hall. Thomas Norris's connection with this family is not entirely clear, but a cadet branch of the same name was present in the neighbouring village of Tarleton by the sixteenth century, and in the early seventeenth one of their number was the first Norris known to have acquired lands in Croston. In the early nineteenth century, the Norris family of Davyhulme Hall, Urmston, claimed descent from the Norris family of Tarleton, and through them from the Norrises of Speke Hall; any such claim would apply equally well to the Norris family of Croston, to whom Thomas Norris certainly belonged.
