= Acentroptera pulchella =

Scientific classification
- Kingdom: Animalia
- Phylum: Arthropoda
- Clade: Pancrustacea
- Class: Insecta
- Order: Coleoptera
- Suborder: Polyphaga
- Infraorder: Cucujiformia
- Family: Chrysomelidae
- Genus: Acentroptera
- Species: A. pulchella

Binomial name
- Acentroptera pulchella (Guérin-Méneville, 1830)

Synonyms
- Hispa pulchella Guérin-Méneville, 1830

Species of beetle

Acentroptera pulchella is a species of beetle of the family Chrysomelidae. It is found in Brazil (Minas Gerais, Rio de Janeiro, Santa Catarina, São Paulo).

== Description ==
Adults reach a length of about 9.7-14.6 mm. They are yellowish-brown, the pronotum with metallic green spots. The elytra are pale yellow with darker areas. There are also two large dark spots.

== Life history ==
The recorded host plants for this species are Aechmea blanchetiana and Neoregelia cruenta.
