= Pseudispa bruchi =

Scientific classification
- Kingdom: Animalia
- Phylum: Arthropoda
- Clade: Pancrustacea
- Class: Insecta
- Order: Coleoptera
- Suborder: Polyphaga
- Infraorder: Cucujiformia
- Family: Chrysomelidae
- Genus: Pseudispa
- Species: P. bruchi

Binomial name
- Pseudispa bruchi (Weise, 1904)

Synonyms
- Cephalodonta bruchi Weise, 1904

Species of beetle

Pseudispa bruchi is a species of beetle of the family Chrysomelidae. It is found in Argentina.

== Life history ==
No host plant has been documented for this species.
