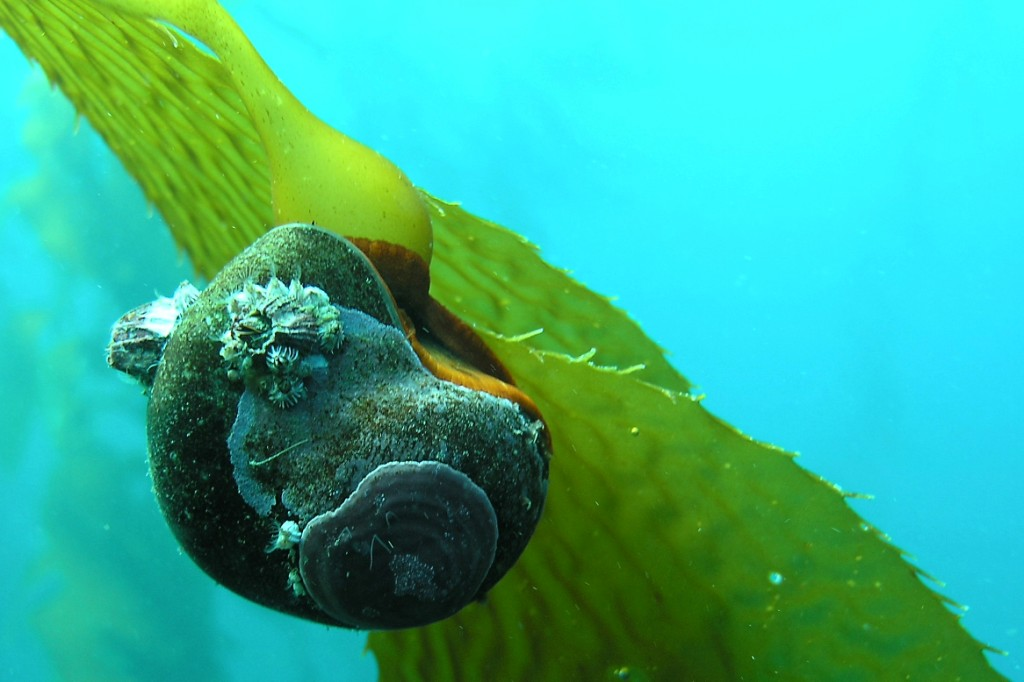
- A live individual of Norrisia norrisii, its shell encrusted with barnacles (upper left) and an encrusting coralline alga (lower right part of the shell). The snail is on the giant kelp, species Macrocystis pyrifera

Scientific classification
- Kingdom: Animalia
- Phylum: Mollusca
- Class: Gastropoda
- Subclass: Vetigastropoda
- Order: Trochida
- Family: Tegulidae
- Genus: Norrisia; Bayle, 1880
- Species: N. norrisii

Binomial name
- Norrisia norrisii (G. B. Sowerby I, 1838)

Synonyms
- Genus: Trochiscus G. B. Sowerby I, 1838 (Invalid: junior homonym of Trochiscus Heyden, 1826 and Trochiscus Held, 1837; Norrisia is a replacement name) Species: Trochiscus convexus Carpenter, 1865; Trochiscus norrisii Sowerby I, 1838 (original combination); Trochus norrisi Flscher; Turbo norrisi Deshayes; Turbo rotelliformis Jay, J.C., 1859

= Norrisia norrisii =

Species of gastropod

The marine snail Norrisia norrisii is a medium-sized gastropod mollusk within the family Tegulidae. It has several common names, including Norris's top snail, Norris's topsnail, norrissnail, smooth brown turban snail, or kelp snail. It was first described by G.B. Sowerby I under the name Trochiscus norrisii (in honour of the naturalist Thomas Norris). It is the only species in the genus Norrisia.

== Distribution ==
The species has been found along the Pacific coast of North America from Monterey to Isla Asuncion on the Baja California peninsula in Mexico. Off the coast of California, with the exception of a persistent population in Diablo Cove, Norrisia norrisi primarily occurs south of Point Conception in the low intertidal and shallow subtidal zones.

== Description ==
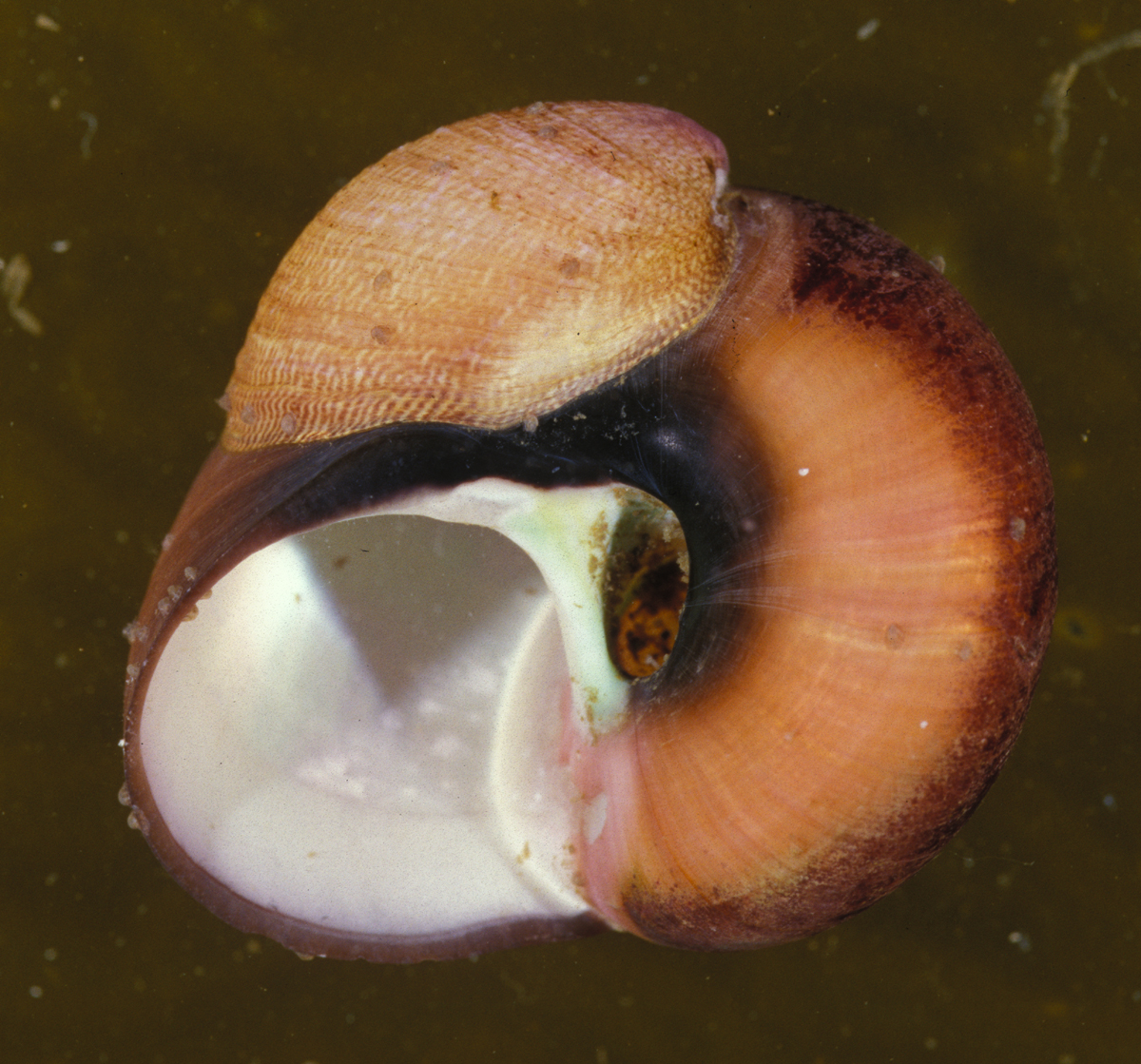
Norrisia norrisii shell with a slipper shell attached.

Norrisia norrisii has a wide, solid, shell that ranges in size from a few mm in juveniles up to 59 mm in adults, as measured across the greatest shell dimension. The shell is smooth, save for light growth lines and ill-defined spiral lines. It is brown or reddish fawn-colored, black around the umbilicus and greenish inside.

Similar to other trochid snails, such as the more commonly occurring Chlorostoma species (or Tegula), the dextrally coiled shell of Norrisia norrisii is also more globose and shows a depressed-turbinate shape.

The spire is low-conoidal. The minute apex is subacute, and spirally striate; when perfect, the apical whorls are variegated. The 6 whorls widen rapidly. They are nearly plane and sloping above. Their edges project outside. They are pa23ery and rolled up like a spiral cord. The body whorl is very large. The thin peristome is simple. The sutures are plain.

Other distinctive features include a smooth, green columella, an open, black-ringed umbilicus. The columellar margin is thickened at the base of the shell, and has a very obtuse tubercle there. The rounded-quadrangular aperture is angular above and brilliantly nacreous inside. It is sealed with an operculum made of protein rather than calcium carbonate. The operculum is circular, multispiral, with a central nucleus. The fleshy foot of the snail is a bright reddish orange with black speckling lining the basal margin. Four elongate epipodial tentacles are spaced evenly along both sides of the muscular foot.

Empty shells of Norrisia norrisii are often occupied by hermit crabs, using the hard shell to protect their poorly armored posterior.

== Ecology ==
=== Habitat ===
Norrisia norrisii can be found in the lower rocky intertidal zone, where these snails graze on algae, microscopic films, and wrack. More commonly Norrisia norrisii is found in the shallow subtidal, particularly in kelp forests. On Santa Catalina Island off the coast of southern California, Norrisia norrisii is commonly seen crawling up and down stipes of the giant kelp Macrocystis pyrifera.

=== Feeding ===
Early studies on the feeding ecology of Norrisia norrisii indicated that these snails preferred to feed on kelps, with a general hierarchy of Egregia > Laminaria farlowii > Macrocystis pyrifera > Eisenia arborea. Using binary choice feeding experiments, Wakefield and Murray (1998) demonstrated that the herbivorous gastropod Norrisia norrisii preferred laminarialean kelps over all other algae tested. When comparing kelps, blades of the giant kelp Macrocystis pyrifera were slightly preferred over the feather boa kelp Egregia menziesii, and both were strongly preferred over sporophylls (i.e. reproductive blades) of the southern sea palm Eisenia arborea. All kelps tested were consistently selected over other algae commonly encountered by Norrisia norrisii (e.g., Halidrys dioica, Dictyota flabellata, and Pterocladia capillacea).

=== Reproduction ===
Very little is known about reproduction by Norrisia norrisii. Some marine snails reproduce by broadcast spawning, releasing sperm and eggs into the water column at the same time, and rely on external fertilization to produce the next generation. Other species internally fertilize eggs, then release larvae or lay egg cases containing the larvae. It is not known which method is used by Norrisia norrisii.

=== Predators ===
Predators of Norrisia norrisii include sea otters, starfish such as Pisaster ochraceus and Pisaster giganteus, California spiny lobster Panulirus interruptus, and drilling mollusks such as octopus and moon snails. When fleeing a predator on a sloping substrate or while crawling on kelp, a Norrisia norrisii may simply detach itself and roll or fall away from the predator. If detached from a giant kelp or other stipitate alga, Norrisia norrisii will quickly crawl towards another kelp upon reaching the bottom. Mortality on the bottom of the reef is much higher than on the giant kelp.

== Gallery ==
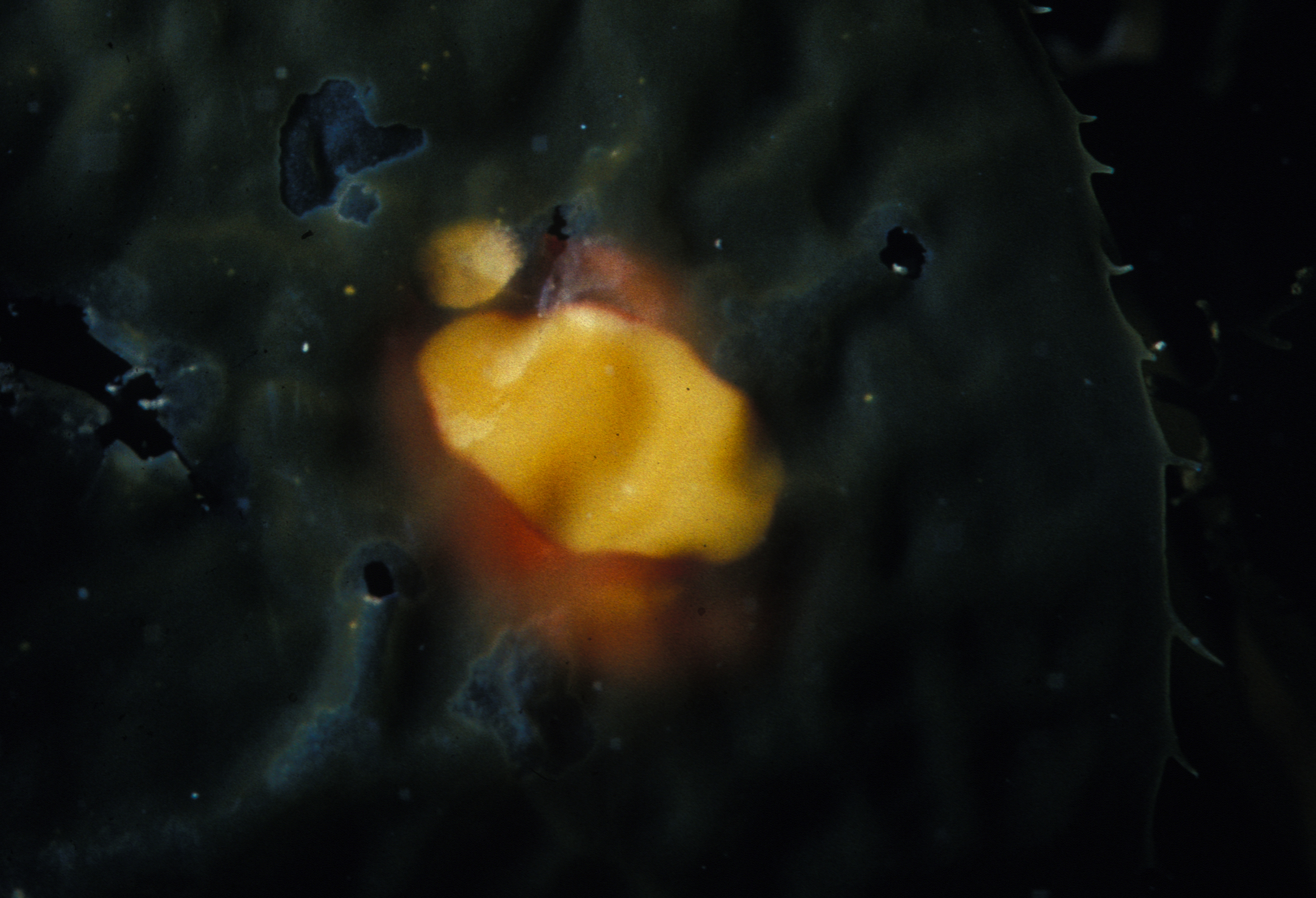
Norrisia norrisii feeding on a blade of the giant kelp Macrocystis pyrifera. Snails use a radula to rasp away the upper layers of kelp tissue.

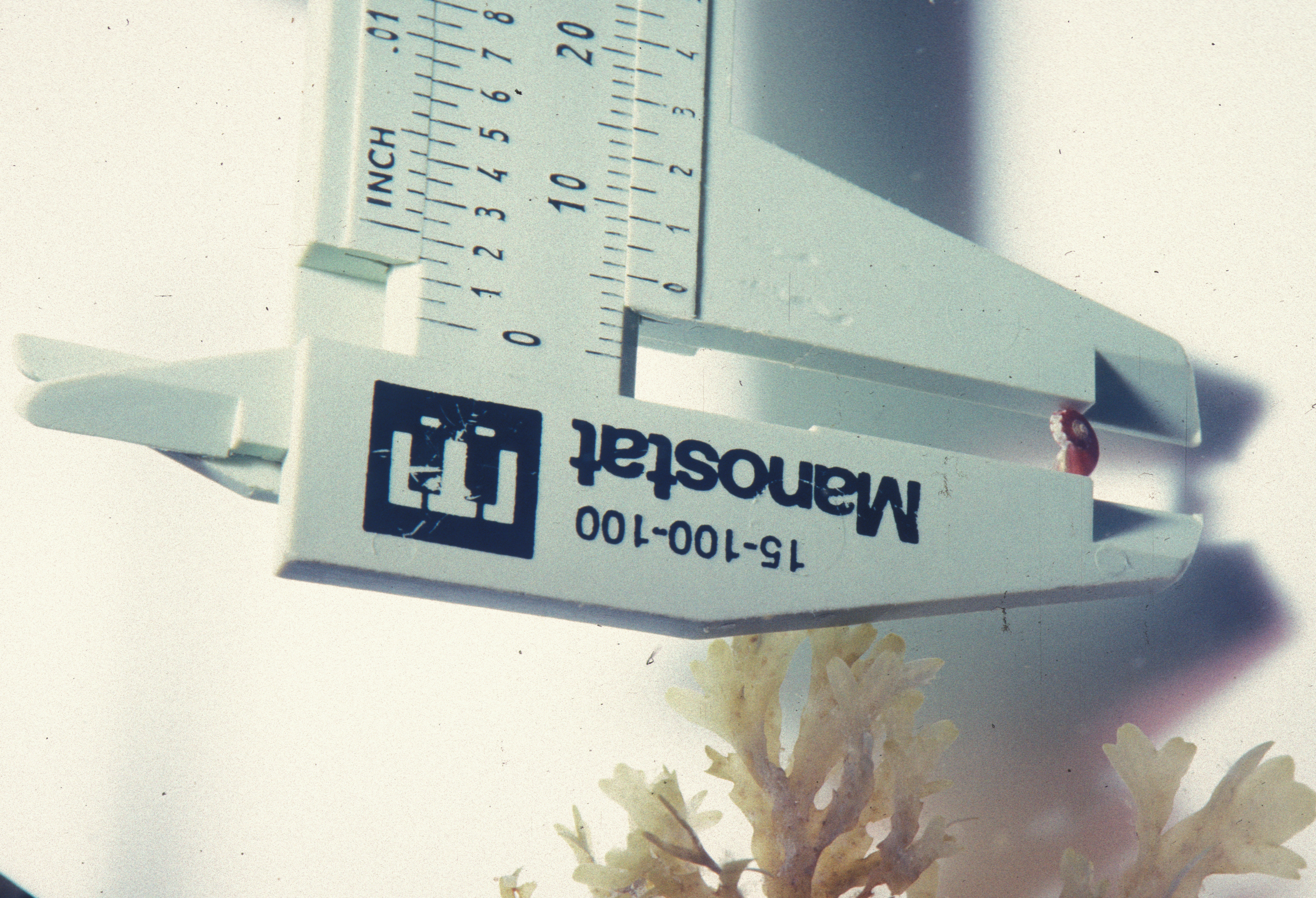
Norrisia norrisii new recruit at 5.5 mm. Note the shell morphology of juveniles differs by having a set of ridges along the whorl.

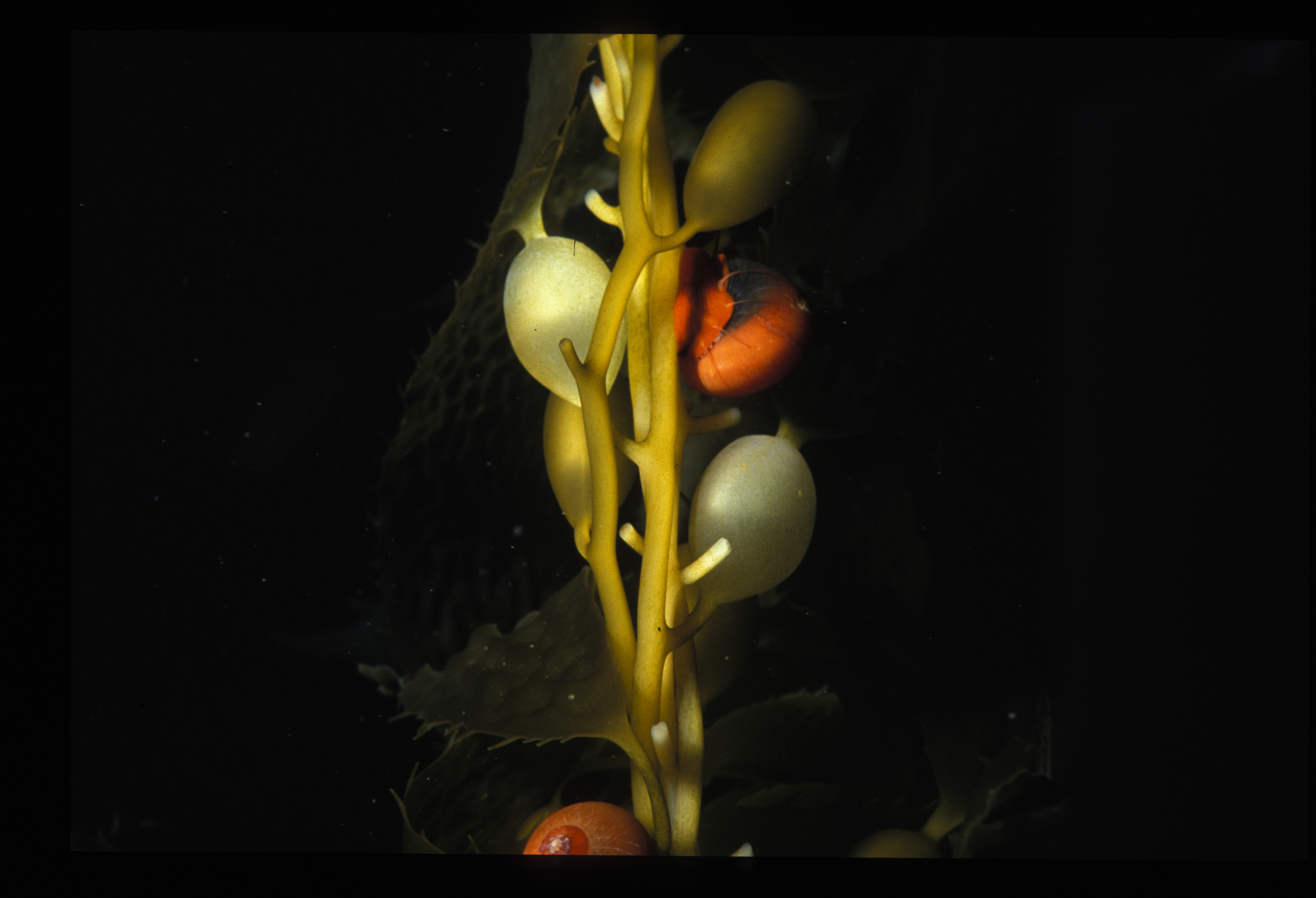
Norrisia norrisii climbing up the giant kelp Macrocystis pyrifera at Pumpernickel Reef on Santa Catalina Island, CA.
