= Pseudispa quadricolor =

Scientific classification
- Kingdom: Animalia
- Phylum: Arthropoda
- Clade: Pancrustacea
- Class: Insecta
- Order: Coleoptera
- Suborder: Polyphaga
- Infraorder: Cucujiformia
- Family: Chrysomelidae
- Genus: Pseudispa
- Species: P. quadricolor

Binomial name
- Pseudispa quadricolor (Weise, 1921)

Synonyms
- Sceloenopla (Pseudhispa) quadricolor Weise, 1921; Pseudispa basicornis Pic, 1928

Species of beetle

Pseudispa quadricolor is a species of beetle of the family Chrysomelidae. It is found in Peru.

== Life history ==
No host plant has been documented for this species.
