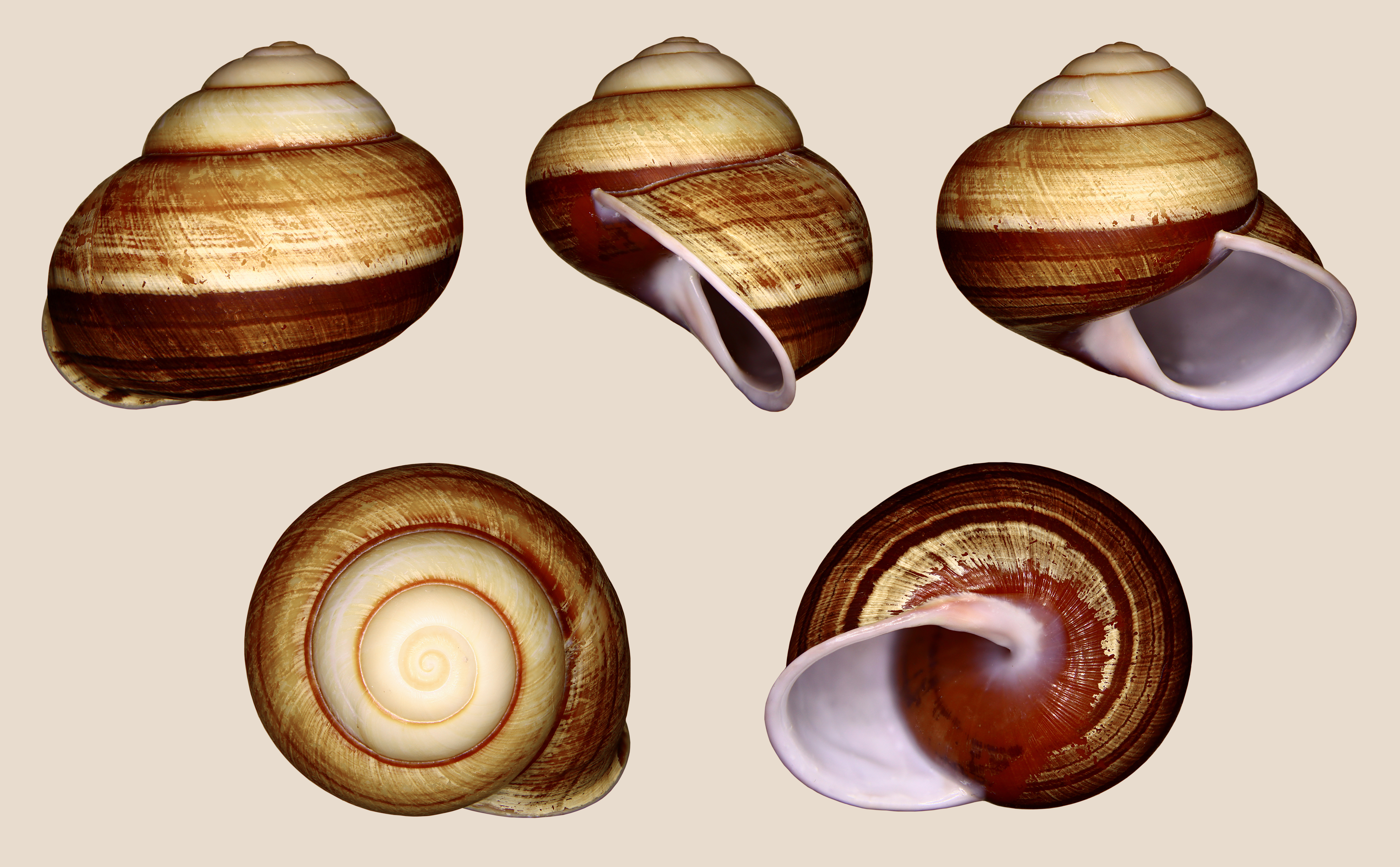
- Five views of a shell of Calocochlea pan

Scientific classification
- Kingdom: Animalia
- Phylum: Mollusca
- Class: Gastropoda
- Order: Stylommatophora
- Family: Camaenidae
- Genus: Calocochlea
- Species: C. pan

Binomial name
- Calocochlea pan Broderip, 1841

Synonyms
- Calocochlia pan (Broderip, 1841) (unaccepted genus); Cochlostyla (Callicochlias) pan (Broderip, 1841) (superseded combination); Cochlostyla (Calocochlea) pan (Broderip, 1841) (superseded combination); Cochlostyla pan (Broderip, 1841) (superseded combination); Helix pan Broderip, 1841 (original combination)

= Calocochlea pan =

Species of gastropod

Calocochlea pan is a species of large air-breathing land snail, a pulmonate gastropod mollusk in the family Camaenidae.

This species is very common in the Philippines. The shell is between 41 and 47 millimeters long with brown spiral bands and a cream-colored background.
