= Ocnosispa depressa =

Scientific classification
- Kingdom: Animalia
- Phylum: Arthropoda
- Class: Insecta
- Order: Coleoptera
- Suborder: Polyphaga
- Infraorder: Cucujiformia
- Family: Chrysomelidae
- Genus: Ocnosispa
- Species: O. depressa

Binomial name
- Ocnosispa depressa Staines, 2002

Species of beetle

Ocnosispa depressa is a species of beetle of the family Chrysomelidae. It is found in Costa Rica.

== Description ==
Adults reach a length of about 6.9 mm. They are dark reddish orange, the elytra with diffuse black markings.

== Life history ==
No host plant has been documented for this species.

== Etymology ==
The species name is derived from Latin depressa (meaning low) and refers to the flattened body.
