= Pseudispa baeri =

Scientific classification
- Kingdom: Animalia
- Phylum: Arthropoda
- Clade: Pancrustacea
- Class: Insecta
- Order: Coleoptera
- Suborder: Polyphaga
- Infraorder: Cucujiformia
- Family: Chrysomelidae
- Genus: Pseudispa
- Species: P. baeri

Binomial name
- Pseudispa baeri Pic, 1928

Species of beetle

Pseudispa baeri is a species of beetle of the family Chrysomelidae. It is found in Peru.

== Life history ==
No host plant has been documented for this species.
