= Ocnosispa arrowi =

Scientific classification
- Kingdom: Animalia
- Phylum: Arthropoda
- Class: Insecta
- Order: Coleoptera
- Suborder: Polyphaga
- Infraorder: Cucujiformia
- Family: Chrysomelidae
- Genus: Ocnosispa
- Species: O. arrowi

Binomial name
- Ocnosispa arrowi (Uhmann, 1938)

Synonyms
- Sceloenopla (Ocnosispa) arrowi Uhmann, 1938

Species of beetle

Ocnosispa arrowi is a species of beetle of the family Chrysomelidae. It is found in Colombia.

== Life history ==
No host plant has been documented for this species.
