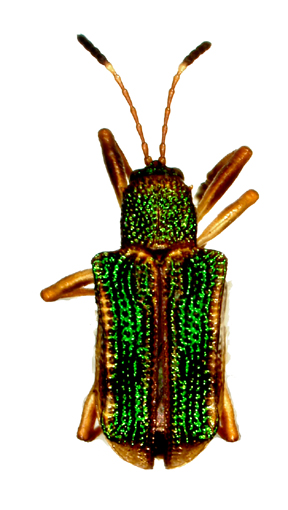

Scientific classification
- Kingdom: Animalia
- Phylum: Arthropoda
- Clade: Pancrustacea
- Class: Insecta
- Order: Coleoptera
- Suborder: Polyphaga
- Infraorder: Cucujiformia
- Family: Chrysomelidae
- Genus: Pseudispa
- Species: P. tuberculata

Binomial name
- Pseudispa tuberculata Staines, 2002

= Pseudispa tuberculata =

Species of beetle

Pseudispa tuberculata is a species of beetle of the family Chrysomelidae. It is found in Belize, Costa Rica, Mexico (Hidalgo, Oaxaca) and Panama.

== Description ==
Adults reach a length of about 3.4-3.8 mm. They are metallic green and yellow, with the antennae and legs paler.

== Life history ==
No host plant has been documented for this species.

== Etymology ==
The species name is derived from Latin tuber (meaning a swelling) and refers to the elytral tubercles.
