= Pseudispa sinuata =

Scientific classification
- Kingdom: Animalia
- Phylum: Arthropoda
- Clade: Pancrustacea
- Class: Insecta
- Order: Coleoptera
- Suborder: Polyphaga
- Infraorder: Cucujiformia
- Family: Chrysomelidae
- Genus: Pseudispa
- Species: P. sinuata

Binomial name
- Pseudispa sinuata Staines, 2002

Species of beetle

Pseudispa sinuata is a species of beetle of the family Chrysomelidae. It is found in Mexico (Oaxaca), Costa Rica and Panama.

== Description ==
Adults reach a length of about 3.1-4 mm. They are metallic green, both the elytra and pronotum with yellowish margins. The antennae are partly brown, yellow and black, while the legs are mostly brown.

== Life history ==
No host plant has been documented for this species.

== Etymology ==
The species name is derived from Latin sinuatus (meaning bend or curve) and refers to the sinuate lateral margins of the pronotum.
