= Ocnosispa coccinea =

Scientific classification
- Kingdom: Animalia
- Phylum: Arthropoda
- Clade: Pancrustacea
- Class: Insecta
- Order: Coleoptera
- Suborder: Polyphaga
- Infraorder: Cucujiformia
- Family: Chrysomelidae
- Genus: Ocnosispa
- Species: O. coccinea

Binomial name
- Ocnosispa coccinea (Guérin-Méneville, 1844)

Synonyms
- Cephalodonta coccinea Guérin-Méneville, 1844; Cephalodonta generosa Guérin-Méneville, 1844

Species of beetle

Ocnosispa coccinea is a species of beetle of the family Chrysomelidae. It is found in French Guiana.

== Life history ==
No host plant has been documented for this species.
