= Ocnosispa conicicollis =

Scientific classification
- Kingdom: Animalia
- Phylum: Arthropoda
- Clade: Pancrustacea
- Class: Insecta
- Order: Coleoptera
- Suborder: Polyphaga
- Infraorder: Cucujiformia
- Family: Chrysomelidae
- Genus: Ocnosispa
- Species: O. conicicollis

Binomial name
- Ocnosispa conicicollis (Baly, 1858)

Synonyms
- Cephalodonta conicicollis Baly, 1858

Species of beetle

Ocnosispa conicicollis is a species of beetle of the family Chrysomelidae. It is found in Brazil (Amazonas, Minas Gerais, Santa Catarina, São Paulo, Pernambuco).

== Description ==
Adults are elongate, flattened along the suture and bright rufous. Three longitudinal stripes on the thorax and the elytra are dark metallic green, the latter each with eight bright rufo-fulvous spots.

== Life history ==
No host plant has been documented for this species.
