= Acentroptera bita =

Scientific classification
- Kingdom: Animalia
- Phylum: Arthropoda
- Clade: Pancrustacea
- Class: Insecta
- Order: Coleoptera
- Suborder: Polyphaga
- Infraorder: Cucujiformia
- Family: Chrysomelidae
- Genus: Acentroptera
- Species: A. bita

Binomial name
- Acentroptera bita Staines, 2014

Species of beetle

Acentroptera bita is a species of beetle of the family Chrysomelidae. It is found in Panama.

== Description ==
Adults reach a length of about 5.5 mm. They are reddish-yellow, the elytra with various dark markings.

== Life history ==
No host plant has been documented for this species.

== Etymology ==
The species name is derived from bita, which is Anglo-Saxon for small or little and refers to the unusually small size of this species.
