= Acentroptera rubronotata =

Scientific classification
- Kingdom: Animalia
- Phylum: Arthropoda
- Clade: Pancrustacea
- Class: Insecta
- Order: Coleoptera
- Suborder: Polyphaga
- Infraorder: Cucujiformia
- Family: Chrysomelidae
- Genus: Acentroptera
- Species: A. rubronotata

Binomial name
- Acentroptera rubronotata Pic, 1932

Species of beetle

Acentroptera rubronotata is a species of beetle of the family Chrysomelidae. It is found in Brazil (Pará, Pernambuco).

== Description ==
Adults reach a length of about 8–10 mm. They are somewhat long, shining and dull brick-red. The elytra are reddish-green with black markings, while the pronotum is red and green with many spots.

== Life history ==
No host plant has been documented for this species.

== Taxonomy ==
The type of this species could not be located in the M. Pic collection in the MNHN by the author of the latest genus revision. Because the original description is too superficial to determine the exact placement of the species it is treated as incertae sedis.
