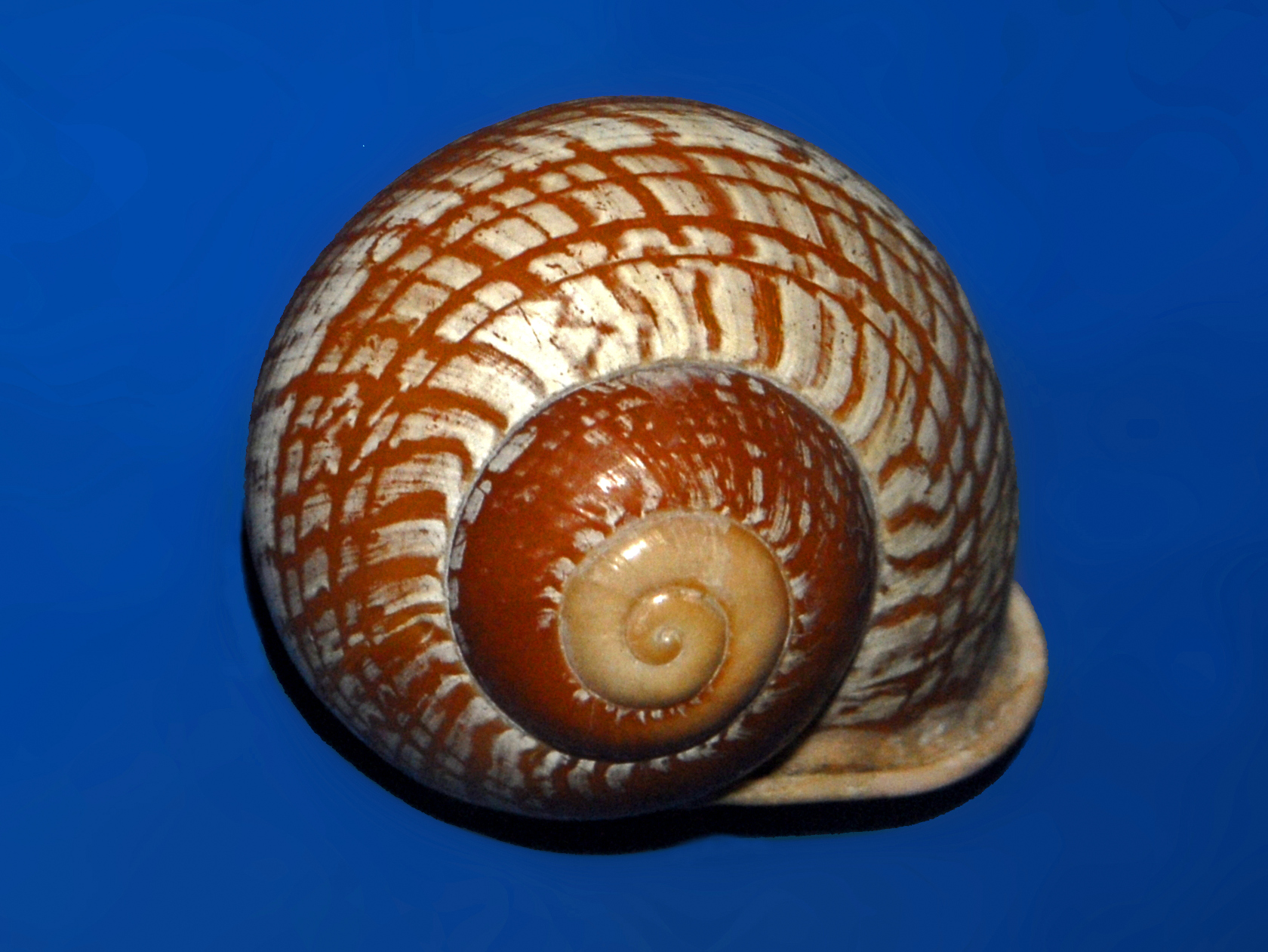
- Shell of Calocochlea pulcherrima from Philippines at the Museo Civico di Storia Naturale di Milano

Scientific classification
- Kingdom: Animalia
- Phylum: Mollusca
- Class: Gastropoda
- Order: Stylommatophora
- Family: Camaenidae
- Genus: Calocochlea
- Species: C. pulcherrima

Binomial name
- Calocochlea pulcherrima (G. B. Sowerby I, 1841)

Synonyms
- Calocochlea luzonica (Reeve, 1842) (junior synonym); Calocochlea luzonica luzonica (Reeve, 1842) (junior synonym); Cochlostyla (Callicochlias) chrysacme Quadras & Möllendorff, 1893 (junior synonym); Cochlostyla (Callicochlias) luzonica (Reeve, 1842) (superseded combination); Cochlostyla (Callicochlias) luzonica luzonica (Reeve, 1842) (superseded combination); Cochlostyla (Callicochlias) pulcherrima (G. B. Sowerby I, 1841) (superseded combination); Cochlostyla chrysacme Quadras & Möllendorff, 1893 (junior synonym); Cochlostyla luzonica (Reeve, 1842) (junior synonym); Cochlostyla pulcherrima (G. B. Sowerby I, 1841) (superseded combination); Helicostyla (Calocochlea) pulcherrima (G. B. Sowerby I, 1841) (superseded combination); Helicostyla pulcherrima (G. B. Sowerby I, 1841) (superseded combination); Helix (Cochlogena) pulcherrima G. B. Sowerby I, 1841 (original combination); Helix luzonica Reeve, 1842 (junior synonym); Helix luzonica L. Pfeiffer, 1842 (junior synonym); Helix pulcherrima G. B. Sowerby I, 1841

= Calocochlea pulcherrima =

Species of gastropod

Calocochlea pulcherrima is a species of large air-breathing land snail, a pulmonate gastropod mollusk in the family Camaenidae.

This species is very common in the Philippines. The shell is between 31 and 46 millimeters long with brown spiral bands and a cream-colored background.
