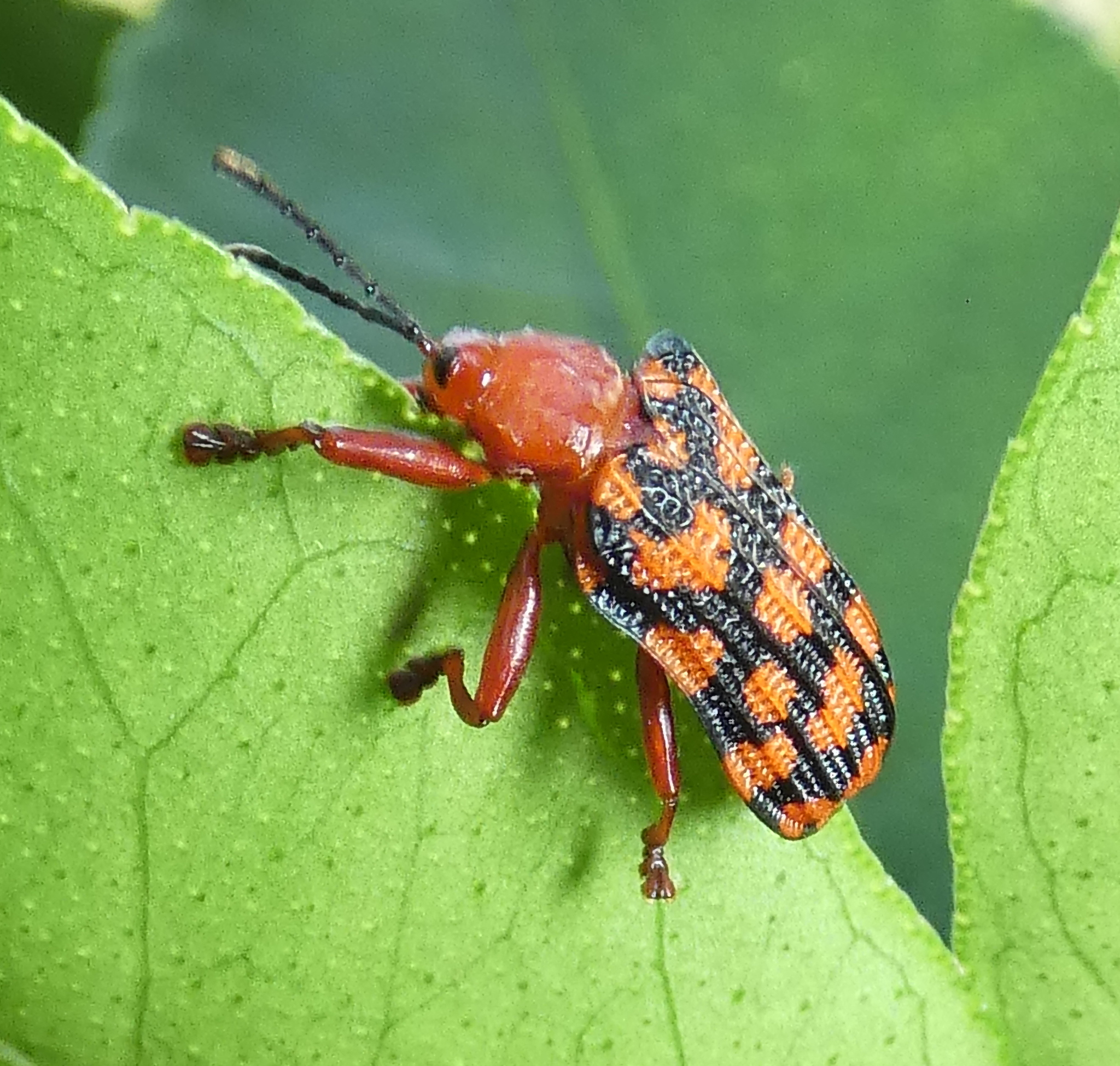
- Sceloenopla maculata

Scientific classification
- Kingdom: Animalia
- Phylum: Arthropoda
- Class: Insecta
- Order: Coleoptera
- Suborder: Polyphaga
- Infraorder: Cucujiformia
- Family: Chrysomelidae
- Subfamily: Cassidinae
- Tribe: Sceloenoplini; Uhmann, 1930

Genera
- see text

Synonyms
- Cephalodontites Chapuis, 1875 (unavailable name); Cephalodontinae Gestro, 1906; Cephalodontini Weise, 1910; Sceloenoplini Uhmann, 1930

= Sceloenoplini =

Tribe of leaf beetles

Sceloenoplini is a tribe of mostly Neotropical leaf beetles within the subfamily Cassidinae.

== Genera ==
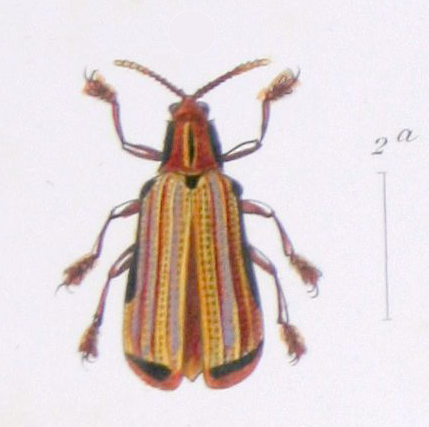
Acentroptera lacordairei

1. Acentroptera Guérin-Méneville, 1844
2. Ocnosispa Weise, 1910
3. Pseudispa Chapuis, 1875
4. Sceloenopla Chevrolat, 1836

=== Selected former genera ===
- Serratispa Staines, 2002 - now in Imatidiini
