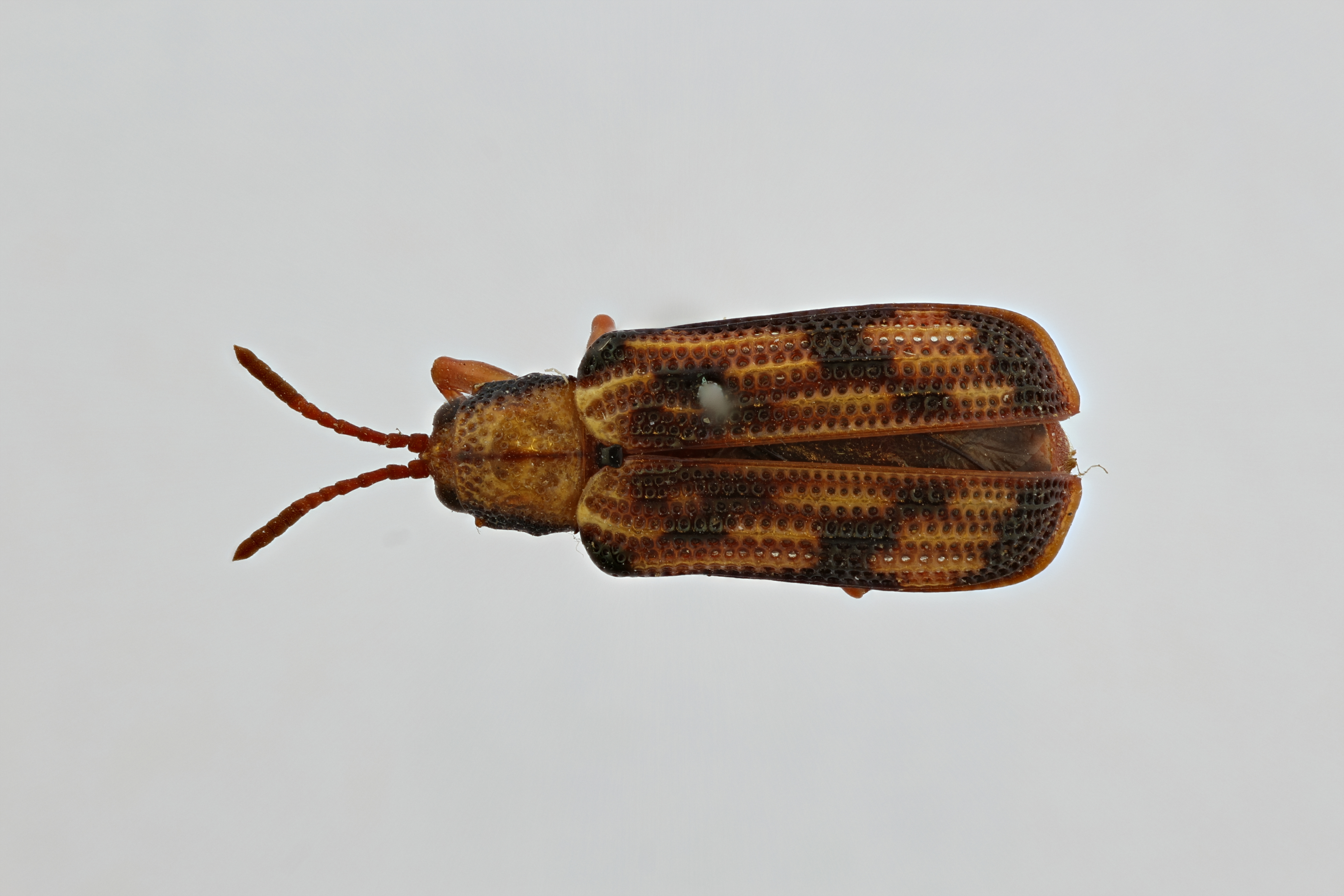

Scientific classification
- Kingdom: Animalia
- Phylum: Arthropoda
- Clade: Pancrustacea
- Class: Insecta
- Order: Coleoptera
- Suborder: Polyphaga
- Infraorder: Cucujiformia
- Family: Chrysomelidae
- Genus: Acentroptera
- Species: A. basilica

Binomial name
- Acentroptera basilica Thomson, 1858

Synonyms
- Acentroptera basilica reducta Pic, 1932

= Acentroptera basilica =

Species of beetle

Acentroptera basilica is a species of beetle of the family Chrysomelidae. It is found in Argentina, Brazil (Rio de Janeiro, São Paulo), French Guiana and Paraguay.

== Description ==
Adults reach a length of about 11–12 mm.

== Life history ==
The recorded host plants for this species are Ananas macrodens and Aechmea aquilega. The larvae mine the leaves of their host plant, while adults are leaf scrapers.
