= Pseudispa fulvolimbata =

Scientific classification
- Kingdom: Animalia
- Phylum: Arthropoda
- Clade: Pancrustacea
- Class: Insecta
- Order: Coleoptera
- Suborder: Polyphaga
- Infraorder: Cucujiformia
- Family: Chrysomelidae
- Genus: Pseudispa
- Species: P. fulvolimbata

Binomial name
- Pseudispa fulvolimbata (Baly, 1858)

Synonyms
- Cephalodonta fulvolimbata Baly, 1858

Species of beetle

Pseudispa fulvolimbata is a species of beetle of the family Chrysomelidae. It is found in Costa Rica and Panama.

== Description ==
Adults are subelongate and bright metallic green above. The base and apex of the thorax, together with the limb of the elytra, are fulvous, the latter stained with dark fuscous spots. The head is bright metallic green and closely punctured. The antennae are pale fulvous, their four terminal joints and some obscure stains on the upper surface of the rest fuscous. The thorax is subquadrate, scarcely longer than broad, slightly narrowed in front, the sides nearly straight, slightly sinuate behind their middle, the anterior angles acute, indistinctly produced anteriorly, above convex from side to side, coarsely and closely punctured, the extreme anterior and basal margins fulvous. The elytra are broader than the base of the thorax, the sides nearly parallel, narrowly margined, slightly dilated behind. The apex is emarginate at the sutural angle, the latter armed with a minute tooth. The posterior angles are obtuse, above convex on the sides, flattened along the suture, deeply punctate-striate, each elytron with four elevated costae, two near the suture and two towards the outer margin, the two former less distinct at their base, confluent just before their apex.

== Life history ==
No host plant has been documented for this species.
