= Acentroptera maculata =

Scientific classification
- Kingdom: Animalia
- Phylum: Arthropoda
- Clade: Pancrustacea
- Class: Insecta
- Order: Coleoptera
- Suborder: Polyphaga
- Infraorder: Cucujiformia
- Family: Chrysomelidae
- Genus: Acentroptera
- Species: A. maculata

Binomial name
- Acentroptera maculata Pic, 1932

Species of beetle

Acentroptera maculata is a species of beetle of the family Chrysomelidae. It is found in Brazil.

== Description ==
Adults reach a length of about 10 mm. They are somewhat elongate and shining. The pronotum is testaceous with three green markings and is densely punctate. There are scattered green maculae on the elytra in many specimens.

== Life history ==
No host plant has been documented for this species.

== Taxonomy ==
The type of this species could not be located in the M. Pic collection in the MNHN by the author of the latest genus revision. Because the original description is too superficial to determine the exact placement of the species it is treated as incertae sedis.
