= Acentroptera emdeni =

Scientific classification
- Kingdom: Animalia
- Phylum: Arthropoda
- Clade: Pancrustacea
- Class: Insecta
- Order: Coleoptera
- Suborder: Polyphaga
- Infraorder: Cucujiformia
- Family: Chrysomelidae
- Genus: Acentroptera
- Species: A. emdeni

Binomial name
- Acentroptera emdeni Uhmann, 1930

Species of beetle

Acentroptera emdeni is a species of beetle of the family Chrysomelidae. It is found in Bolivia, Brazil (Rio de Janeiro), Colombia, Ecuador, Panama and Peru.

== Description ==
Adults reach a length of about 8.6–10 mm. They are brownish-yellow with a darker sheen. The antennae are black and the abdomen is partly dark.

== Life history ==
No host plant has been documented for this species.
