= Ocnosispa atripennis =

Scientific classification
- Kingdom: Animalia
- Phylum: Arthropoda
- Class: Insecta
- Order: Coleoptera
- Suborder: Polyphaga
- Infraorder: Cucujiformia
- Family: Chrysomelidae
- Genus: Ocnosispa
- Species: O. atripennis

Binomial name
- Ocnosispa atripennis (Pic, 1929)

Synonyms
- Sceloenopla (Ocnosispa) atripennis Pic, 1929

Species of beetle

Ocnosispa atripennis is a species of beetle of the family Chrysomelidae. It is found in Peru.

== Life history ==
No host plant has been documented for this species.
