= Acentroptera strandi =

Scientific classification
- Kingdom: Animalia
- Phylum: Arthropoda
- Clade: Pancrustacea
- Class: Insecta
- Order: Coleoptera
- Suborder: Polyphaga
- Infraorder: Cucujiformia
- Family: Chrysomelidae
- Genus: Acentroptera
- Species: A. strandi

Binomial name
- Acentroptera strandi Uhmann, 1943

Species of beetle

Acentroptera strandi is a species of beetle of the family Chrysomelidae. It is found in Costa Rica and Panama.

== Description ==
Adults reach a length of about 6.7-9.1 mm. They are dull brick-red, the pronotum with a brown spot.

== Life history ==
The host plant is unknown, but adults have been collected from Pentaclethra macroloba.
