= Acentroptera zikani =

Scientific classification
- Kingdom: Animalia
- Phylum: Arthropoda
- Clade: Pancrustacea
- Class: Insecta
- Order: Coleoptera
- Suborder: Polyphaga
- Infraorder: Cucujiformia
- Family: Chrysomelidae
- Genus: Acentroptera
- Species: A. zikani

Binomial name
- Acentroptera zikani Uhmann, 1935

Species of beetle

Acentroptera zikani is a species of beetle of the family Chrysomelidae. It is found in Brazil (Minas Gerais).

== Description ==
Adults reach a length of about 12.1 mm. They are reddish-brown with black markings.

== Life history ==
No host plant has been documented for this species.
