= Ocnosispa humerosa =

Scientific classification
- Kingdom: Animalia
- Phylum: Arthropoda
- Class: Insecta
- Order: Coleoptera
- Suborder: Polyphaga
- Infraorder: Cucujiformia
- Family: Chrysomelidae
- Genus: Ocnosispa
- Species: O. humerosa

Binomial name
- Ocnosispa humerosa Staines, 2002

Species of beetle

Ocnosispa humerosa is a species of beetle of the family Chrysomelidae. It is found in Costa Rica.

== Description ==
Adults reach a length of about 12.4 mm. The antennae are black, while the head, pronotum, elytra and legs are reddish yellow. The elytra have yellow with black markings.

== Life history ==
The host plant is unknown, but adults have been collected from Conceveiba pleiostemona.

== Etymology ==
The species name is derived from Latin humerus (meaning shoulder) and refers to the expanded humeri.
