= Ocnosispa =

Scientific classification
- Kingdom: Animalia
- Phylum: Arthropoda
- Class: Insecta
- Order: Coleoptera
- Suborder: Polyphaga
- Infraorder: Cucujiformia
- Family: Chrysomelidae
- Subfamily: Cassidinae
- Tribe: Sceloenoplini
- Genus: Ocnosispa; Weise, 1910

Genus of leaf beetles

Ocnosispa is a genus of leaf beetles of the family Chrysomelidae.

== Species ==
- Ocnosispa aemula (Weise, 1910)
- Ocnosispa armata (Baly, 1858)
- Ocnosispa arrowi (Uhmann, 1938)
- Ocnosispa atripennis (Pic, 1929)
- Ocnosispa batesii (Baly, 1858)
- Ocnosispa bilineaticollis (Pic, 1937)
- Ocnosispa cardinalis (Guérin-Méneville, 1844)
- Ocnosispa coccinea (Guérin-Méneville, 1844)
- Ocnosispa condyla Staines, 2002
- Ocnosispa conicicollis (Baly, 1858)
- Ocnosispa denieri (Uhmann, 1940)
- Ocnosispa depressa Staines, 2002
- Ocnosispa flohri (Weise, 1910)
- Ocnosispa humerosa Staines, 2002
- Ocnosispa lateralis (Baly, 1858)
- Ocnosispa magnifica (Uhmann, 1932)
- Ocnosispa nubila (Weise, 1910)
- Ocnosispa pectoralis (Uhmann, 1950)
- Ocnosispa sachtlebeni Uhmann, 1957
- Ocnosispa sallei (Baly, 1858)
- Ocnosispa simoni (Pic, 1934)
- Ocnosispa trifasciata (Weise, 1910)
