= Ocnosispa simoni =

Scientific classification
- Kingdom: Animalia
- Phylum: Arthropoda
- Class: Insecta
- Order: Coleoptera
- Suborder: Polyphaga
- Infraorder: Cucujiformia
- Family: Chrysomelidae
- Genus: Ocnosispa
- Species: O. simoni

Binomial name
- Ocnosispa simoni (Pic, 1934)

Synonyms
- Sceloenopla (Ocnosispa) simoni Pic, 1934

Species of beetle

Ocnosispa simoni is a species of beetle of the family Chrysomelidae. It is found in Venezuela.

== Life history ==
No host plant has been documented for this species.
