= Ocnosispa bilineaticollis =

Scientific classification
- Kingdom: Animalia
- Phylum: Arthropoda
- Class: Insecta
- Order: Coleoptera
- Suborder: Polyphaga
- Infraorder: Cucujiformia
- Family: Chrysomelidae
- Genus: Ocnosispa
- Species: O. bilineaticollis

Binomial name
- Ocnosispa bilineaticollis (Pic, 1937)

Synonyms
- Sceloenopla (Pseudispa) bilineaticollis Pic, 1937

Species of beetle

Ocnosispa bilineaticollis is a species of beetle of the family Chrysomelidae. It is found in Brazil.

== Life history ==
No host plant has been documented for this species.
