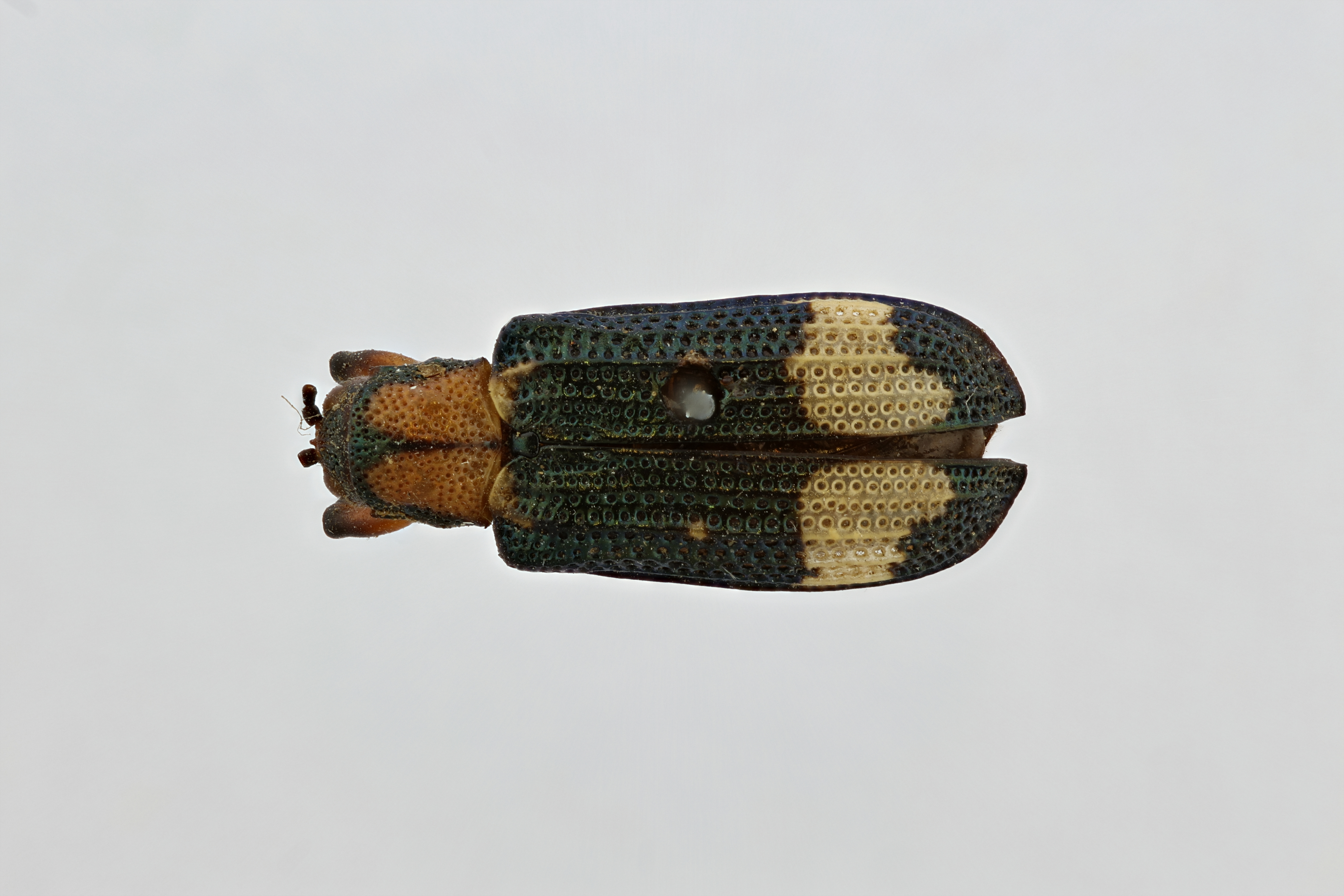

Scientific classification
- Kingdom: Animalia
- Phylum: Arthropoda
- Clade: Pancrustacea
- Class: Insecta
- Order: Coleoptera
- Suborder: Polyphaga
- Infraorder: Cucujiformia
- Family: Chrysomelidae
- Genus: Acentroptera
- Species: A. dejeanii

Binomial name
- Acentroptera dejeanii Guérin-Méneville, 1844

Synonyms
- Acenthroptera alapista Thomson, 1856

= Acentroptera dejeanii =

Species of beetle

Acentroptera dejeanii is a species of beetle of the family Chrysomelidae. It is found in Brazil (Rio de Janeiro) and Colombia.

== Description ==
Adults reach a length of about 11–14 mm.

== Life history ==
No host plant has been documented for this species.
