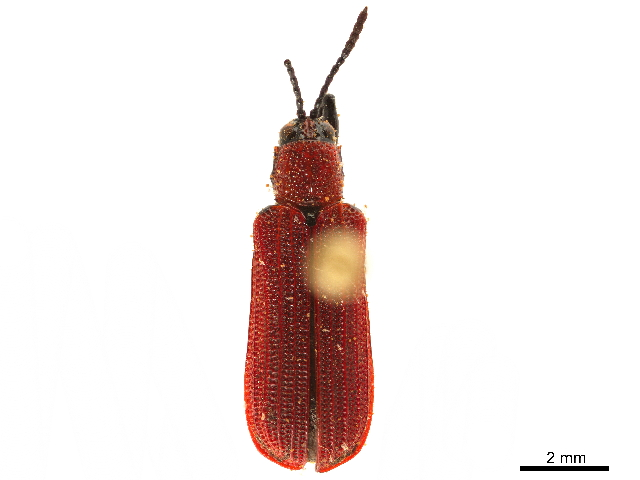

Scientific classification
- Kingdom: Animalia
- Phylum: Arthropoda
- Clade: Pancrustacea
- Class: Insecta
- Order: Coleoptera
- Suborder: Polyphaga
- Infraorder: Cucujiformia
- Family: Chrysomelidae
- Genus: Acentroptera
- Species: A. nevermanni

Binomial name
- Acentroptera nevermanni Uhmann, 1930

= Acentroptera nevermanni =

Species of beetle

Acentroptera nevermanni is a species of beetle of the family Chrysomelidae. It is found in Costa Rica, Guatemala, Honduras and Mexico.

== Description ==
Adults reach a length of about 7.3-9.4 mm. They are dull brick-red, with the lateral margin of the pronotum darker.

== Life history ==
The host plant is unknown, but adults have been collected from bromeliads (Bromeliaceae).
