= Pseudispa bellula =

Scientific classification
- Kingdom: Animalia
- Phylum: Arthropoda
- Clade: Pancrustacea
- Class: Insecta
- Order: Coleoptera
- Suborder: Polyphaga
- Infraorder: Cucujiformia
- Family: Chrysomelidae
- Genus: Pseudispa
- Species: P. bellula

Binomial name
- Pseudispa bellula Staines, 2002

Species of beetle

Pseudispa bellula is a species of beetle of the family Chrysomelidae. It is found in Costa Rica.

== Description ==
Adults reach a length of about 4.4-4.8 mm. They have a bright metallic green dorsum, with the basal and apical margins of the pronotum and the lateral and apical margins of the elytra brownish. The legs are black and the antennae are brown (but the apical four antennomeres are black).

== Life history ==
No host plant has been documented for this species.

== Etymology ==
The species name is derived from Latin bellulus (meaning beautiful) and refers to the beautiful aspect of this beetle.
