= Favartia norrisii =

Scientific classification
- Kingdom: Animalia
- Phylum: Mollusca
- Class: Gastropoda
- Subclass: Caenogastropoda
- Order: Neogastropoda
- Family: Muricidae
- Genus: Favartia
- Species: F. norrisii

Binomial name
- Favartia norrisii (Reeve, 1845)

Synonyms
- Murex norrisii Reeve, 1845

Species of gastropod

Favartia norrisii is a species of sea snail, a marine gastropod mollusc in the family Muricidae, the murex snails or rock snails. It was first described by L.A. Reeve in 1845, under the name Murex norrisii (in honour of the naturalist Thomas Norris).
