= Ocnosispa condyla =

Scientific classification
- Kingdom: Animalia
- Phylum: Arthropoda
- Class: Insecta
- Order: Coleoptera
- Suborder: Polyphaga
- Infraorder: Cucujiformia
- Family: Chrysomelidae
- Genus: Ocnosispa
- Species: O. condyla

Binomial name
- Ocnosispa condyla Staines, 2002

Species of beetle

Ocnosispa condyla is a species of beetle of the family Chrysomelidae. It is found in Costa Rica.

== Description ==
Adults reach a length of about 9.6 mm. They are yellowish-brown, the pronotum with two longitudinal vittae and the elytra with diffuse brownish markings.

== Life history ==
No host plant has been documented for this species.

== Etymology ==
The species name is derived from Greek condylus (meaning knuckle, knob or protuberance) and refers to the humeral prominences.
