= Pseudispa gemmans =

Scientific classification
- Kingdom: Animalia
- Phylum: Arthropoda
- Clade: Pancrustacea
- Class: Insecta
- Order: Coleoptera
- Suborder: Polyphaga
- Infraorder: Cucujiformia
- Family: Chrysomelidae
- Genus: Pseudispa
- Species: P. gemmans

Binomial name
- Pseudispa gemmans (Baly, 1885)

Synonyms
- Cephalodonta gemmans Baly, 1885; Cephalodonta generosa Baly, 1885 (preocc.)

Species of beetle

Pseudispa gemmans is a species of beetle of the family Chrysomelidae. It is found in Costa Rica and Guatemala.

== Description ==
The head is finely granulose, the vertex impressed with a deep longitudinal groove and the front produced just above the insertion of the antennae into a short triangular plate. The antennae are half the length of the body, filiform and slightly thickened towards the apex. The thorax is longer than broad, the sides nearly straight and parallel, slightly angulate, the anterior angle armed with a short obtuse tooth. The upper surface is closely covered with large foveolate punctures. The scutellum is narrowly oblong, longitudinally sulcate. The elytra are oblong, the sides slightly constricted just before the middle, rounded and slightly dilated posteriorly, the apex acutely rounded, conjointly emarginate at the suture, the sutural angle armed with a small tooth. Each elytron has ten, at the extreme base with eleven, rows of large punctures, the humeral callus is laterally produced, cristate, and forming the anterior portion of a longitudinal costa, which, interrupted in its middle portion, extends along the sixth interspace to its apex. On the rest of the interspaces are eight or nine longitudinal ridges or tubercles.

== Biology ==
The food plant is unknown.
