= Ocnosispa sallei =

Scientific classification
- Kingdom: Animalia
- Phylum: Arthropoda
- Class: Insecta
- Order: Coleoptera
- Suborder: Polyphaga
- Infraorder: Cucujiformia
- Family: Chrysomelidae
- Genus: Ocnosispa
- Species: O. sallei

Binomial name
- Ocnosispa sallei (Baly, 1858)

Synonyms
- Cephalodonta sallei Baly, 1858

Species of beetle

Ocnosispa sallei is a species of beetle of the family Chrysomelidae. It is found in Belize and Mexico (Veracruz).

== Description ==
Adults are subcuneiform, shining black beneath, opaque fulvous above. The head, a broad vitta on the thorax, the scutellum, and a short sutural line at the base of the elytra are all black. The lateral border of the thorax, together with the extreme outer border of the elytra near the suture are narrowly edged with blackish-piceous.

== Life history ==
No host plant has been documented for this species.
