= Pseudispa =

Scientific classification
- Kingdom: Animalia
- Phylum: Arthropoda
- Clade: Pancrustacea
- Class: Insecta
- Order: Coleoptera
- Suborder: Polyphaga
- Infraorder: Cucujiformia
- Family: Chrysomelidae
- Subfamily: Cassidinae
- Tribe: Sceloenoplini
- Genus: Pseudispa; Chapuis, 1875

Synonyms
- Cephalodonta (Pseudispa) Chapuis, 1875

Genus of leaf beetles

Pseudispa is a genus of leaf beetles of the family Chrysomelidae.

== Species ==
- Pseudispa annulicornis (Pic, 1934)
- Pseudispa baeri Pic, 1928
- Pseudispa bellula Staines, 2002
- Pseudispa breveapicalis (Pic, 1934)
- Pseudispa bruchi (Weise, 1904)
- Pseudispa brunni (Weise, 1910)
- Pseudispa clara (Weise, 1904)
- Pseudispa donckieri (Weise, 1904)
- Pseudispa fulvolimbata (Baly, 1858)
- Pseudispa gemmans (Baly, 1885)
- Pseudispa humerosa (Weise, 1904)
- Pseudispa marginata (Guérin-Méneville, 1844)
- Pseudispa postfasciata (Pic, 1934)
- Pseudispa quadricolor (Weise, 1921)
- Pseudispa sinuata Staines, 2002
- Pseudispa tuberculata Staines, 2002
- Pseudispa viridis (Pic, 1934)
- Pseudispa zikani (Uhmann, 1935)
