= Acentroptera lineata =

Scientific classification
- Kingdom: Animalia
- Phylum: Arthropoda
- Clade: Pancrustacea
- Class: Insecta
- Order: Coleoptera
- Suborder: Polyphaga
- Infraorder: Cucujiformia
- Family: Chrysomelidae
- Genus: Acentroptera
- Species: A. lineata

Binomial name
- Acentroptera lineata Staines, 2014

Species of beetle

Acentroptera lineata is a species of beetle of the family Chrysomelidae. It is found in Panama.

== Description ==
Adults reach a length of about 7.5-8.2 mm. They are orangish-yellow with a reddish-purple marking.

== Life history ==
The host plant is unknown, but adults have been collected from an unidentified bromeliad (Bromeliaceae).

== Etymology ==
The species name is derived from Latin linea (meaning line or stripe) and refers to the elytral vittae of this species.
