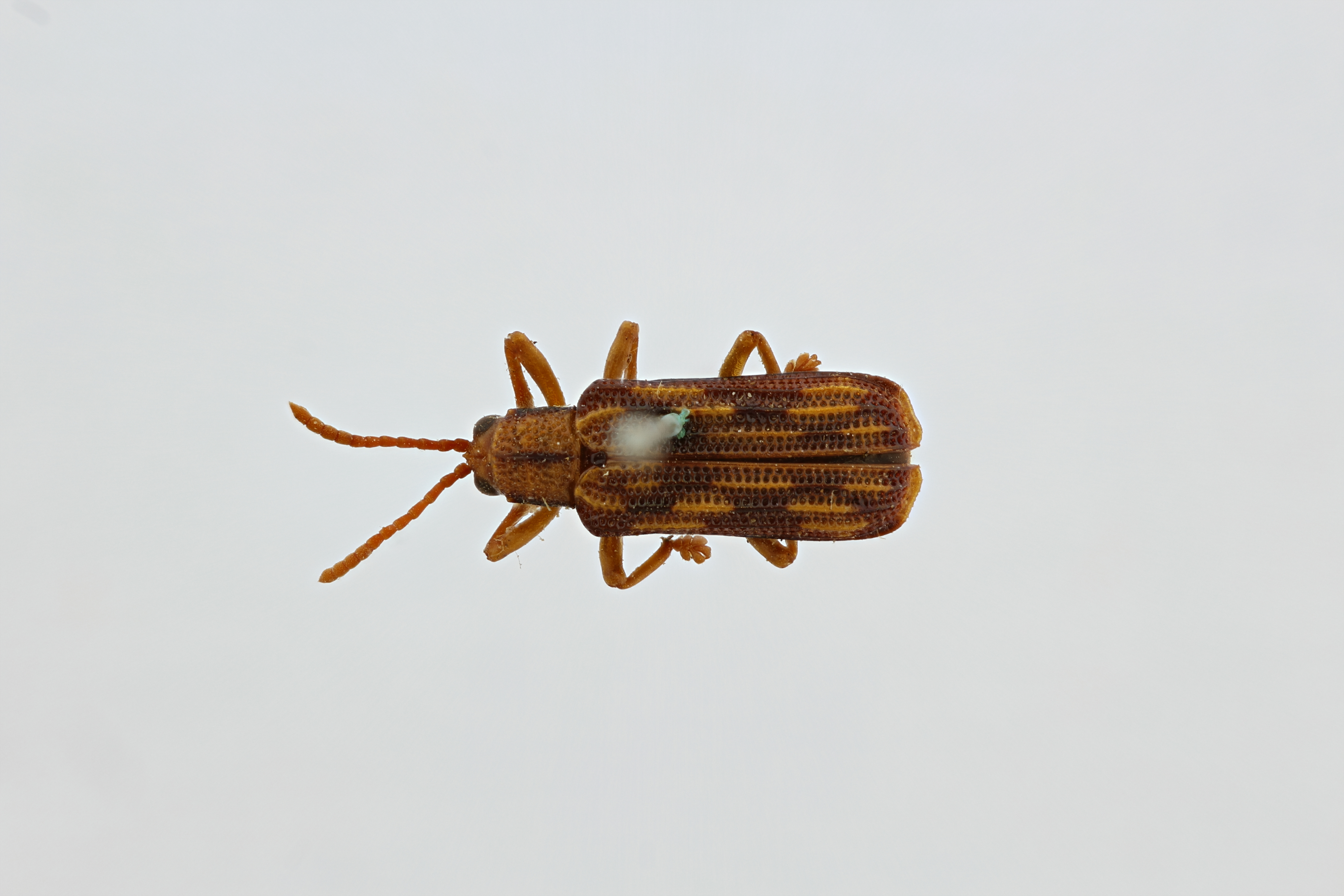

Scientific classification
- Kingdom: Animalia
- Phylum: Arthropoda
- Clade: Pancrustacea
- Class: Insecta
- Order: Coleoptera
- Suborder: Polyphaga
- Infraorder: Cucujiformia
- Family: Chrysomelidae
- Genus: Acentroptera
- Species: A. tessellata

Binomial name
- Acentroptera tessellata Baly, 1858

= Acentroptera tessellata =

Species of beetle

Acentroptera tessellata is a species of beetle of the family Chrysomelidae. It is found in Brazil (Bahia, Rio de Janeiro).

== Description ==
Adults reach a length of about 7.7 mm. The body (including antennae and legs) is yellowish, the pronotum with a darker spot and lateral margins. There are stretched darker spots on the elytra.

== Life history ==
No host plant has been documented for this species.
