= Ocnosispa lateralis =

Scientific classification
- Kingdom: Animalia
- Phylum: Arthropoda
- Class: Insecta
- Order: Coleoptera
- Suborder: Polyphaga
- Infraorder: Cucujiformia
- Family: Chrysomelidae
- Genus: Ocnosispa
- Species: O. lateralis

Binomial name
- Ocnosispa lateralis (Baly, 1858)

Synonyms
- Cephalodonta lateralis Baly, 1858

Species of beetle

Ocnosispa lateralis is a species of beetle of the family Chrysomelidae. It is found in Peru.

== Description ==
Adults are narrow, elongate and bright rufo-fulvous. The elytra (their lateral border excepted), mouth, pleurae, the four posterior tibiae as also the apex of the front pair, all the tarsi and the abdomen (the base and sides of the latter excepted) are black.

== Life history ==
No host plant has been documented for this species.
