= Ocnosispa nubila =

Scientific classification
- Kingdom: Animalia
- Phylum: Arthropoda
- Class: Insecta
- Order: Coleoptera
- Suborder: Polyphaga
- Infraorder: Cucujiformia
- Family: Chrysomelidae
- Genus: Ocnosispa
- Species: O. nubila

Binomial name
- Ocnosispa nubila (Weise, 1910)

Synonyms
- Cephalodonta (Ocnosispa) nubila Weise, 1910

Species of beetle

Ocnosispa nubila is a species of beetle of the family Chrysomelidae. It is found in Mexico.

== Life history ==
No host plant has been documented for this species.
