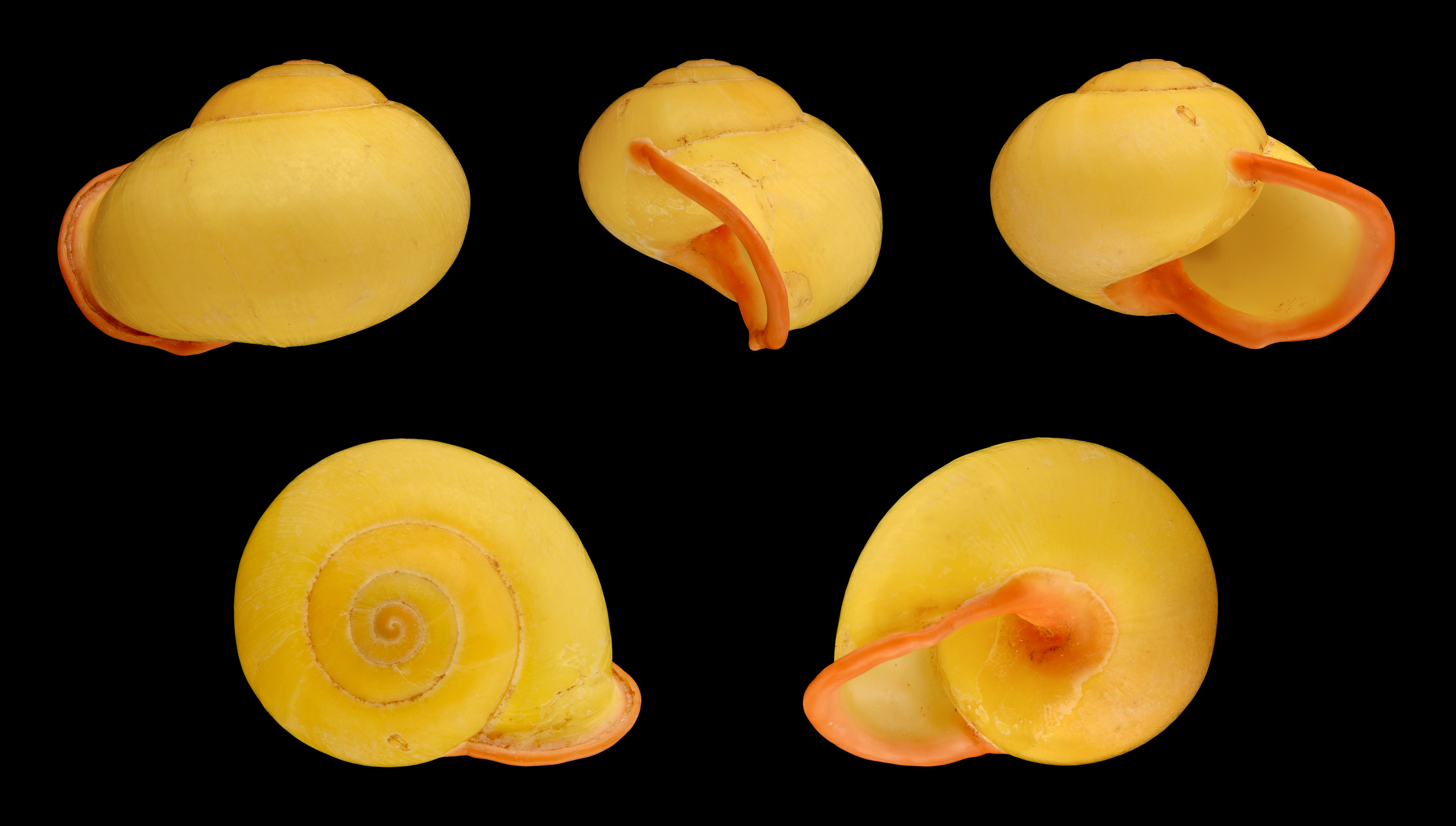
- Five views of a shell of Calocochlea festiva

Scientific classification
- Domain: Eukaryota
- Kingdom: Animalia
- Phylum: Mollusca
- Class: Gastropoda
- Order: Stylommatophora
- Family: Camaenidae
- Genus: Calocochlea
- Species: C. festiva

Binomial name
- Calocochlea festiva Donavan, 1825

Synonyms
- Calocochlia annae (O. Semper, 1862) (unaccepted genus; junior synonym); Calocochlia festiva (Donovan, 1825) (unaccepted genus); Cochlostyla (Callicochlias) annae (O. Semper, 1862) (junior synonym); Cochlostyla (Callicochlias) festiva (Donovan, 1825) (superseded combination); Cochlostyla (Calocochlea) festiva (Donovan, 1825) (superseded combination); Cochlostyla annae (O. Semper, 1862) (junior synonym); Cochlostyla festiva (Donovan, 1825) (superseded combination); Helicostyla (Calocochlea) festiva (Donovan, 1825) (superseded combination); Helix (Callicochlias) annae O. Semper, 1862 (superseded combination); Helix (Calocochlea) festiva Donovan, 1825; Helix anna (O. Semper, 1862) (misspelling of original name, Helix (Callicochlias) annae); Helix festiva Donovan, 1825

= Calocochlea festiva =

Species of gastropod

Calocochlea festiva is a species of land snail, a pulmonate gastropod mollusk in the family Camaenidae.
