= Acentroptera ohausi =

Scientific classification
- Kingdom: Animalia
- Phylum: Arthropoda
- Class: Insecta
- Order: Coleoptera
- Suborder: Polyphaga
- Infraorder: Cucujiformia
- Family: Chrysomelidae
- Genus: Acentroptera
- Species: A. ohausi

Binomial name
- Acentroptera ohausi Weise, 1910

Species of beetle

Acentroptera ohausi is a species of beetle of the family Chrysomelidae. It is found in Ecuador.

== Description ==
Adults reach a length of about 9.5-11.3 mm. They are shining and black, while the elytra are brownish-red, often with two black spots.

== Life history ==
The host plant is unknown, but adults have been collected from a bromeliad species (Bromeliaceae).
