= Ocnosispa batesii =

Scientific classification
- Kingdom: Animalia
- Phylum: Arthropoda
- Class: Insecta
- Order: Coleoptera
- Suborder: Polyphaga
- Infraorder: Cucujiformia
- Family: Chrysomelidae
- Genus: Ocnosispa
- Species: O. batesii

Binomial name
- Ocnosispa batesii (Baly, 1858)

Synonyms
- Cephalodonta batesii Baly, 1858

Species of beetle

Ocnosispa batesii is a species of beetle of the family Chrysomelidae. It is found in Brazil (Amazonas).

== Description ==
Adults are subelongate, broader behind, convex and sanguineous. The antennae (their basal joint excepted) and elytra are black, the latter covered with sanguineous spots.

== Life history ==
No host plant has been documented for this species.
