= Pseudophosphorus =

Scientific classification
- Kingdom: Animalia
- Phylum: Arthropoda
- Class: Insecta
- Order: Coleoptera
- Suborder: Polyphaga
- Infraorder: Cucujiformia
- Family: Cerambycidae
- Genus: Pseudophosphorus
- Species: P. norrisii

Binomial name
- Pseudophosphorus norrisii (Westwood, 1836)

Synonyms
- Lamia norrisii Westwood, 1836

Genus of beetles

Pseudophosphorus norrisii is a species of beetle in the family Cerambycidae, and the only species in the genus Pseudophosphorus. It was first described by J.O. Westwood in 1836, under the name Lamia norrisii (in honour of the naturalist Thomas Norris). It is found in Côte d'Ivoire, Sierra Leone, and Nigeria.
