= Ocnosispa magnifica =

Scientific classification
- Kingdom: Animalia
- Phylum: Arthropoda
- Class: Insecta
- Order: Coleoptera
- Suborder: Polyphaga
- Infraorder: Cucujiformia
- Family: Chrysomelidae
- Genus: Ocnosispa
- Species: O. magnifica

Binomial name
- Ocnosispa magnifica (Uhmann, 1932)

Synonyms
- Sceloenopla (Ocnosispa) magnifica Uhmann, 1932

Species of beetle

Ocnosispa magnifica is a species of beetle of the family Chrysomelidae. It is found in Bolivia.

== Life history ==
No host plant has been documented for this species.
