= Ocnosispa pectoralis =

Scientific classification
- Kingdom: Animalia
- Phylum: Arthropoda
- Class: Insecta
- Order: Coleoptera
- Suborder: Polyphaga
- Infraorder: Cucujiformia
- Family: Chrysomelidae
- Genus: Ocnosispa
- Species: O. pectoralis

Binomial name
- Ocnosispa pectoralis (Uhmann, 1950)

Synonyms
- Sceloenopla (Ocnosispa) pectoralis Uhmann, 1950

Species of beetle

Ocnosispa pectoralis is a species of beetle of the family Chrysomelidae. It is found in Brazil (Bahia).

== Life history ==
No host plant has been documented for this species.
