= Pseudispa marginata =

Scientific classification
- Kingdom: Animalia
- Phylum: Arthropoda
- Clade: Pancrustacea
- Class: Insecta
- Order: Coleoptera
- Suborder: Polyphaga
- Infraorder: Cucujiformia
- Family: Chrysomelidae
- Genus: Pseudispa
- Species: P. marginata

Binomial name
- Pseudispa marginata (Guérin-Méneville, 1844)

Synonyms
- Cephalodonta marginata Guérin-Méneville, 1844

Species of beetle

Pseudispa marginata is a species of beetle of the family Chrysomelidae. It is found in Brazil (Parana, Rio Grande do Sul, São Paulo).

== Life history ==
No host plant has been documented for this species.
