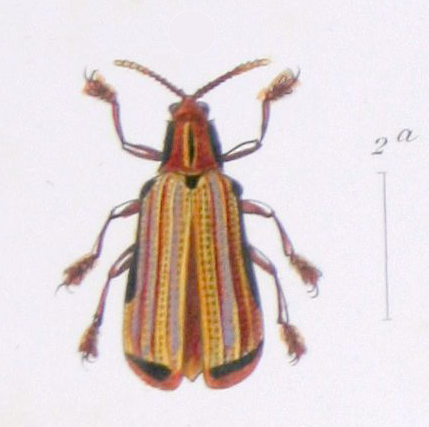

Scientific classification
- Kingdom: Animalia
- Phylum: Arthropoda
- Clade: Pancrustacea
- Class: Insecta
- Order: Coleoptera
- Suborder: Polyphaga
- Infraorder: Cucujiformia
- Family: Chrysomelidae
- Genus: Acentroptera
- Species: A. lacordairei

Binomial name
- Acentroptera lacordairei Lucas, 1859

= Acentroptera lacordairei =

Species of beetle

Acentroptera lacordairei is a species of beetle of the family Chrysomelidae. It is found in Bolivia and Brazil (Espírito Santo).

== Description ==
Adults reach a length of about 12–13 mm. They are yellowish, with reddish antennae. The pronotum has a long black spot and black lateral margins. The lateral margins of the elytra are black and there is a black band.

== Life history ==
No host plant has been documented for this species.
