= Pseudispa zikani =

Scientific classification
- Kingdom: Animalia
- Phylum: Arthropoda
- Clade: Pancrustacea
- Class: Insecta
- Order: Coleoptera
- Suborder: Polyphaga
- Infraorder: Cucujiformia
- Family: Chrysomelidae
- Genus: Pseudispa
- Species: P. zikani

Binomial name
- Pseudispa zikani (Uhmann, 1935)

Synonyms
- Sceloenopla (Pseudispa) zikani Uhmann, 1935

Species of beetle

Pseudispa zikani is a species of beetle of the family Chrysomelidae. It is found in Brazil.

== Life history ==
No host plant has been documented for this species.
