= Ocnosispa armata =

Scientific classification
- Kingdom: Animalia
- Phylum: Arthropoda
- Class: Insecta
- Order: Coleoptera
- Suborder: Polyphaga
- Infraorder: Cucujiformia
- Family: Chrysomelidae
- Genus: Ocnosispa
- Species: O. armata

Binomial name
- Ocnosispa armata (Baly, 1858)

Synonyms
- Cephalodonta armata Baly, 1858

Species of beetle

Ocnosispa armata is a species of beetle of the family Chrysomelidae. It is found in Paraguay.

== Description ==
Adults are broadly elongate, scarcely dilated behind, subdepressed and fulvous. Three vittae on the thorax and the elytra are obscure rufo-fuscous with a metallic green reflexion. Each elytron has eight pale fulvous spots.

== Life history ==
No host plant has been documented for this species.
