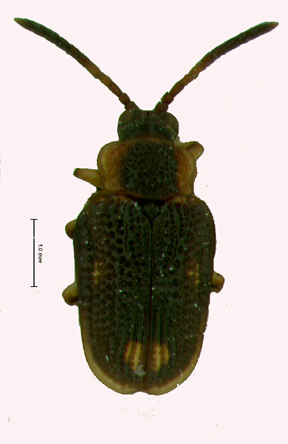

Scientific classification
- Kingdom: Animalia
- Phylum: Arthropoda
- Clade: Pancrustacea
- Class: Insecta
- Order: Coleoptera
- Suborder: Polyphaga
- Infraorder: Cucujiformia
- Family: Chrysomelidae
- Subfamily: Cassidinae
- Tribe: Imatidiini
- Genus: Serratispa; Staines, 2002
- Species: S. quadricosta

Binomial name
- Serratispa quadricosta Staines, 2002

= Serratispa =

Genus of beetles

Serratispa is a genus of leaf beetles in the family Chrysomelidae. It is monotypic, being represented by the single species, Serratispa quadricosta, which is found in Brazil.

== Description ==
Adults reach a length of about 4.3 mm. They are castaneous with paler yellowish markings and yellowish legs.

== Etymology ==
The genus name is derived from Latin serratus (meaning saw) plus -ispa (for Hispinae). The species name is derived from Latin quadra (meaning four) plus costa (meaning ridge) and refers to the four lateral plicae on the elytra.

== Taxonomy ==
The genus was initially placed in the tribe Sceloenoplini, but later moved to the tribe Imatidiini.
