= Acentroptera =

Scientific classification
- Kingdom: Animalia
- Phylum: Arthropoda
- Clade: Pancrustacea
- Class: Insecta
- Order: Coleoptera
- Suborder: Polyphaga
- Infraorder: Cucujiformia
- Family: Chrysomelidae
- Subfamily: Cassidinae
- Tribe: Sceloenoplini
- Genus: Acentroptera; Guérin-Méneville, 1844

Genus of leaf beetles

Acentroptera is a genus of Neotropical leaf beetles of the family Sceloenoplini.

== Species ==
- Acentroptera basilica Thomson, 1858
- Acentroptera bita Staines, 2014
- Acentroptera dejeanii Guérin-Méneville, 1844
- Acentroptera emdeni Uhmann, 1930
- Acentroptera lacordairei Lucas, 1859
- Acentroptera lineata Staines, 2014
- Acentroptera maculata Pic, 1932
- Acentroptera nevermanni Uhmann, 1930
- Acentroptera norrisii Guérin-Méneville, 1844
- Acentroptera ohausi Weise, 1910
- Acentroptera pulchella Guérin-Méneville, 1830
- Acentroptera rubronotata Pic, 1932
- Acentroptera strandi Uhmann, 1943
- Acentroptera tessellata Baly, 1858
- Acentroptera zikani Uhmann, 1935
