= Acentroptera norrisii =

Scientific classification
- Kingdom: Animalia
- Phylum: Arthropoda
- Clade: Pancrustacea
- Class: Insecta
- Order: Coleoptera
- Suborder: Polyphaga
- Infraorder: Cucujiformia
- Family: Chrysomelidae
- Genus: Acentroptera
- Species: A. norrisii

Binomial name
- Acentroptera norrisii Guérin-Méneville, 1844

Species of beetle

Acentroptera norrisii is a species of beetle of the family Chrysomelidae. It is found in Brazil (Parana, Rio de Janeiro, Santa Catharina, São Paulo) and French Guiana.

== Description ==
Adults reach a length of about 10.4-11.5 mm. They are reddish, with a yellowish head. The antennae are also reddish, with a few darker areas. The pronotum has a black marking on the lateral margins and stretched spot. The elytra are yellowish with red margins and two black bands.

== Life history ==
No host plant has been documented for this species.
