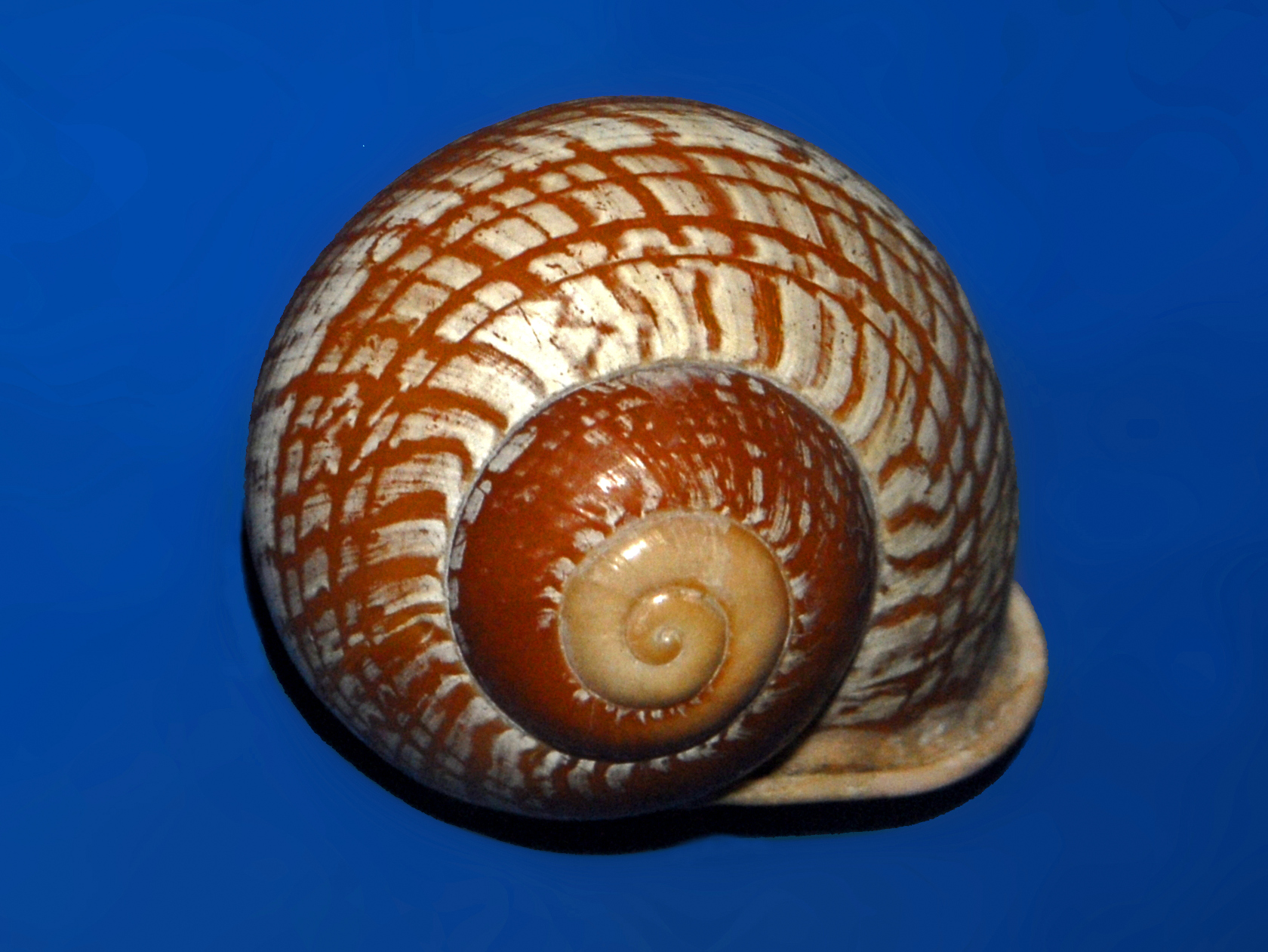
- Shell of Calocochlea pulcherrima from Philippines at the Museo Civico di Storia Naturale di Milano

Scientific classification
- Kingdom: Animalia
- Phylum: Mollusca
- Class: Gastropoda
- Order: Stylommatophora
- Superfamily: Helicoidea
- Family: Camaenidae
- Subfamily: Bradybaeninae
- Genus: Calocochlea; Hartmann, 1840

Type species
- Helix pulcherrima G. B. Sowerby I, 1841

Synonyms
- Callicochlias Agassiz, 1847 (unjustified emendation of the original name Calocochlea); Calocochlia Hartmann, 1840 (unavailable; nomen nudum); Cochlostyla (Callicochlias) Agassiz, 1847 (unjustified emendation); Cochlostyla (Calocochlea) Hartmann, 1843 (superseded combination); Halocochlea Bartsch, 1932; Helicostyla (Calocochlea) Hartmann, 1843 (superseded combination); Helicostyla (Calocochlia) Hartmann, 1843 (unaccepted genus); Helix (Callicochlias) Agassiz, 1847 (superseded combination); Helix (Calocochlea) Hartmann, 1843 (original rank)

= Calocochlea =

Genus of gastropods

Calocochlea is a genus of large air-breathing land snails, pulmonate gastropod mollusks in the family Camaenidae.

== Species ==
- Calocochlea albaiensis Sowerby I, 1841
- Calocochlea amicta (Reeve, 1851)
- Calocochlea aopta (Clench & Archer, 1933)
- Calocochlea augusta (Albers, 1854)
- Calocochlea barnetti (Barnett, 1989)
- Calocochlea bruguieriana Pfeiffer, 1845
- Calocochlea cailliaudi G. P. Deshayes, 1839
- Calocochlea carbonaria Sowerby I, 1842
- Calocochlea chlorochroa Sowerby I, 1841
- Calocochlea chrysocheila Sowerby I, 1842
- Calocochlea coccomelos Sowerby I, 1841
- Calocochlea codonensis (Hidalgo, 1888)
- Calocochlea collodes Sowerby I, 1832
- Calocochlea coronadoi J. Hidalgo, 1868
- Calocochlea crossei (Hidalgo, 1887)
- Calocochlea cryptica W. J. Broderip, 1840
- Calocochlea cumingi Pfeiffer, 1842
- Calocochlea damahoyiPfeiffer, 1856
- Calocochlea dattaensis (O. Semper, 1866)
- Calocochlea dautzenbergi (Hidalgo, 1901)
- Calocochlea dayritorum (Barnett, 1989)
- Calocochlea decipiens (G. B. Sowerby I, 1841)
- Calocochlea denticulata (Jay, 1839)
- Calocochlea depressa Semper, 1877
- Calocochlea elerae O. F. von Möllendorff, 1896
- Calocochlea erythrospira (Möllendorff, 1890)
- Calocochlea festiva Donavan, 1825
- Calocochlea garibaldiana Dohrn & Semper, 1862
- Calocochlea generalis Pfeiffer, 1854
- Calocochlea gertrudis (Möllendorff, Kobelt & Winter, 1912)
- Calocochlea gilberti (Quadras & Möllendorff, 1896)
- Calocochlea harfordi W. J. Broderip, 1841
- Calocochlea hemisphaerion (L. Pfeiffer, 1851)
- Calocochlea hidalgoi O. F. von Möllendorff, 1894
- Calocochlea intorta Sowerby I, 1840
- Calocochlea kobelti O. F. von Möllendorff, 1890
- Calocochlea lalloensis (L. Pfeiffer, 1855)
- Calocochlea leucauchen O. F. von Möllendorff, 1895
- Calocochlea libata (Reeve, 1851)
- Calocochlea lignaria (L. Pfeiffer, 1847)
- Calocochlea lignicolor (Möllendorff, 1888)
- Calocochlea lillianae P. Bartsch, 1932
- Calocochlea luengoi (Hidalgo, 1888)
- Calocochlea magistra Pfeiffer, 1852
- Calocochlea matruelis Sowerby I, 1841
- Calocochlea melanocheila Valenciennes, 1840
- Calocochlea melanorhaphe (Quadras & Möllendorff, 1896)
- Calocochlea metallora (Möllendorff, 1898)
- Calocochlea microspira (L. Pfeiffer, 1854)
- Calocochlea mindanaensis Sowerby I, 1842
- Calocochlea moreleti Pfeiffer, 1848
- Calocochlea norrissii Sowerby I, 1842
- Calocochlea obtusa (L. Pfeiffer, 1845)
- Calocochlea pan W. J. Broderip, 1841
- Calocochlea perpallida P. Bartsch, 1932
- Calocochlea persimilis A. de Férussac, 1850
- Calocochlea polillensis (L. Pfeiffer, 1861)
- Calocochlea ponderosa (L. Pfeiffer, 1845)
- Calocochlea princeps (Reeve, 1854)
- Calocochlea propitia Fulton, 1907
- Calocochlea pulcherrima Sowerby I, 1841
- Calocochlea pyrostoma A. de Férussac, 1821
- Calocochlea retusa (L. Pfeiffer, 1845)
- Calocochlea roebeleni (Möllendorff, 1894)
- Calocochlea roissyana A. de Férussac, 1821
- Calocochlea saranganica J. Hidalgo, 1887
- Calocochlea schadenbergi O. F. von Möllendorff, 1890
- Calocochlea semperi O. F. von Möllendorff, 1893
- Calocochlea siquijorensis W. J. Broderip, 1841
- Calocochlea sphaerion Sowerby I, 1841
- Calocochlea streptostoma (Möllendorff, 1893)
- Calocochlea submirabilis O. F. von Möllendorff, 1897
- Calocochlea suprabadia (C. Semper, 1877)
- Calocochlea trisculpta (Möllendorff, 1894)
- Calocochlea tukanensis Pfeiffer, 1871
- Calocochlea valenciennesii Eydoux, 1838
- Calocochlea weberi P. Bartsch, 1919
- Calocochlea xanthobasis (Pilsbry, 1892)
- Calocochlea zebuensis W. J. Broderip, 1841
- Calocochlea zonifera Pfeiffer, 1842

Species brought into synonymy

- Calocochlea cromyodes (L. Pfeiffer, 1843) : synonym of Calocochlea valenciennii (Eydoux, 1838) (junior synonym)
- Calocochlea luzonica Sowerby I, 1842 : synonym of Calocochlea pulcherrima (G. B. Sowerby I, 1841) (junior synonym)
- Calocochlea samarensis Semper, 1877: synonym of Calocochlea zonifera samarensis (C. Semper, 1877)
- Calocochlea sowerbyi (Hidalgo, 1896): synonym of Calocochlea decipiens (G. B. Sowerby I, 1841) (junior synonym)
