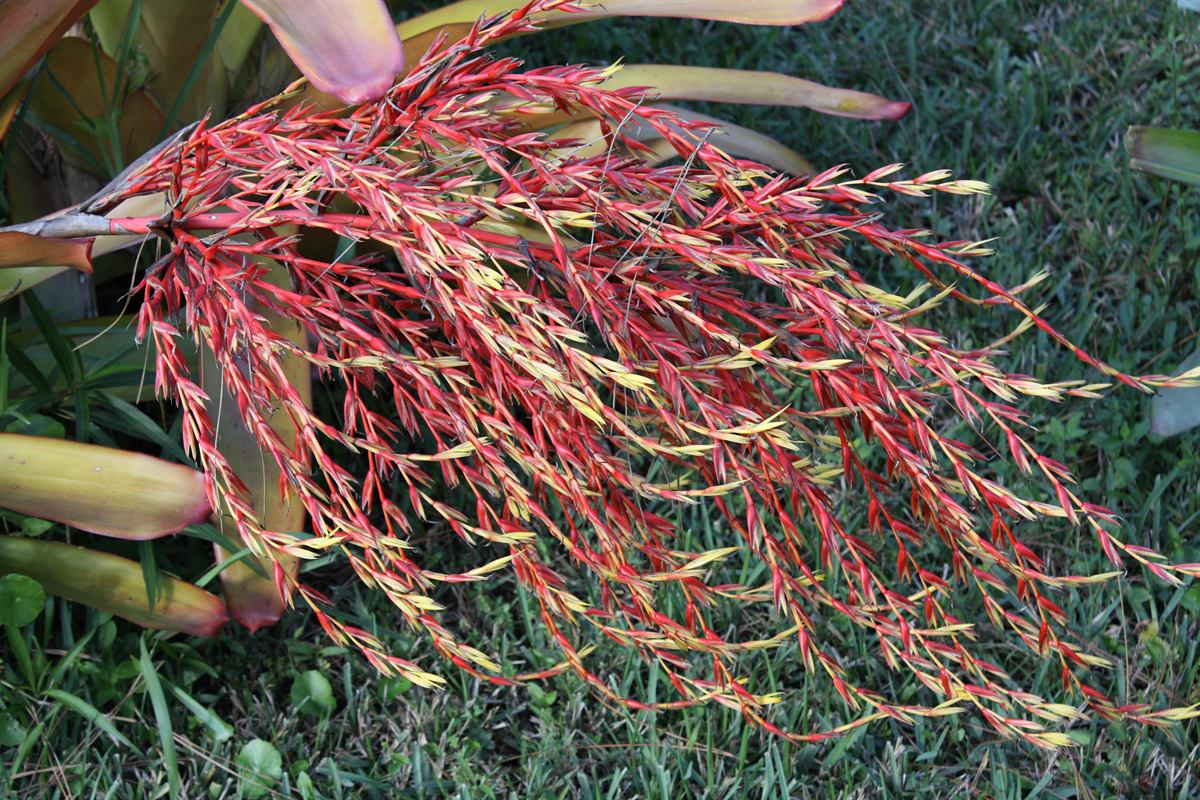

Scientific classification
- Kingdom: Plantae
- Clade: Tracheophytes
- Clade: Angiosperms
- Clade: Monocots
- Clade: Commelinids
- Order: Poales
- Family: Bromeliaceae
- Genus: Aechmea
- Subgenus: Aechmea subg. Aechmea
- Species: A. blanchetiana

Binomial name
- Aechmea blanchetiana (Baker) L.B.Sm.

Synonyms
- Tillandsia blanchetiana Baker; Streptocalyx laxiflorus Baker; Aechmea laxiflora (Baker) Mez 1892, illegitimate homonym, not Benth. 1844; Aechmea remotiflora Mez

= Aechmea blanchetiana =

Species of plant

Aechmea blanchetiana, also known as orangeade bromeliad, is a common bromeliad species found in the restingnas vegetation along the Atlantic Coast which is part of the Atlantic forest biome in eastern Brazil. This plant grows from the State of Bahia south to Espírito Santo. It is common worldwide in tropical and sub-tropical regions for its use as an ornamental plant.

== Description ==
Orangeade bromeliad usually consists of many thorny, long leaves, which increases its length as the plant matures, reaching up to 90cm (36 inches). It can grow up to 120cm (4 feet) in height including the stalk. Despite being known for its orange colour, the plant can also be green, crimson, and yellow.

In its natural habitat, the plant, like other bromeliads, is most often pollinated by hummingbirds. However, it can also be pollinated by bees, bats, and other pollinators. similar to how other bromeliads reproduce, this plant typically makes pups, although it can also breed in a normal way by making seeds. The plant is most often seen being terrestrial, however it can be an epiphyte as well.

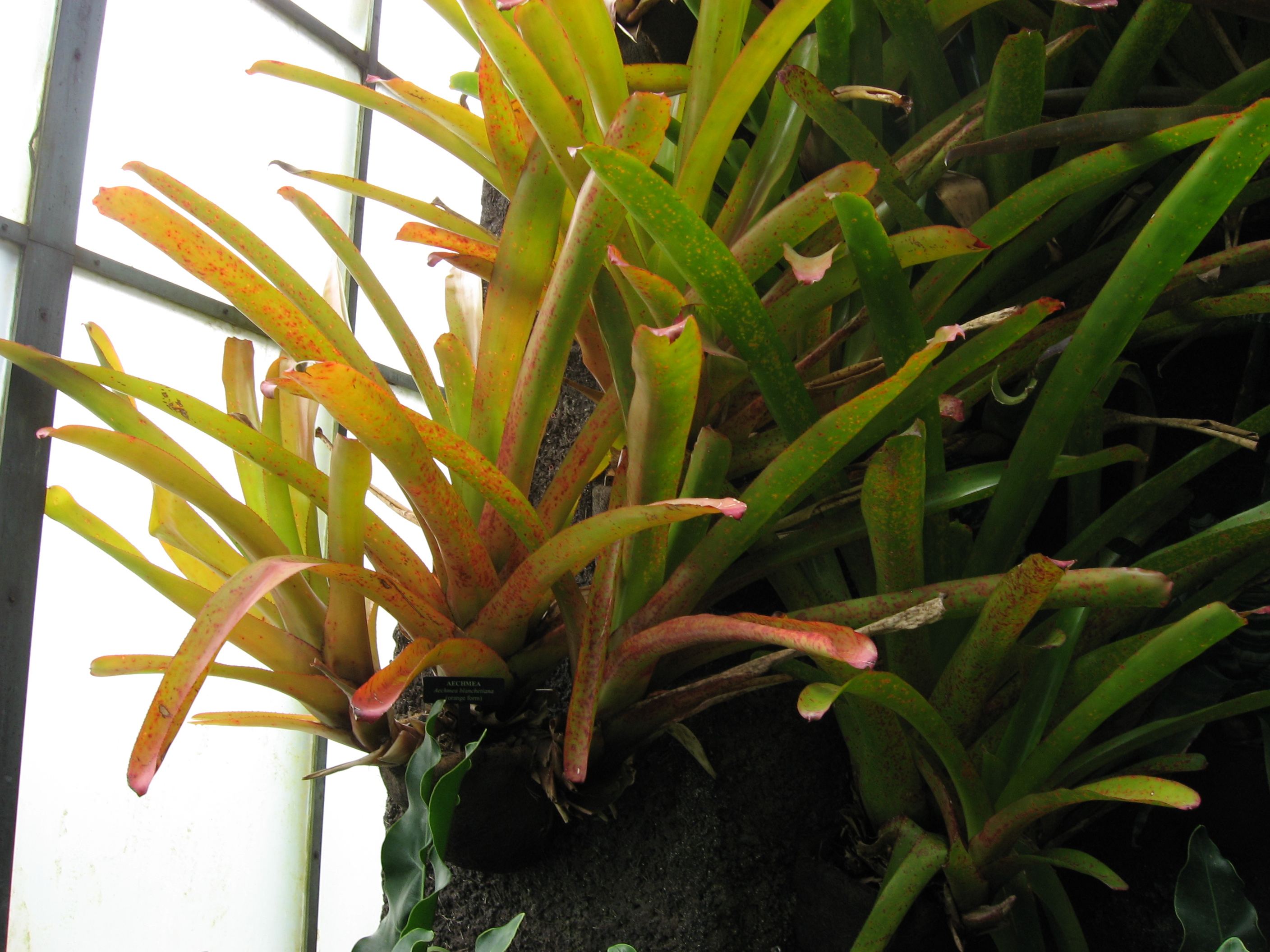
The orange form of Aechmea blanchetiana

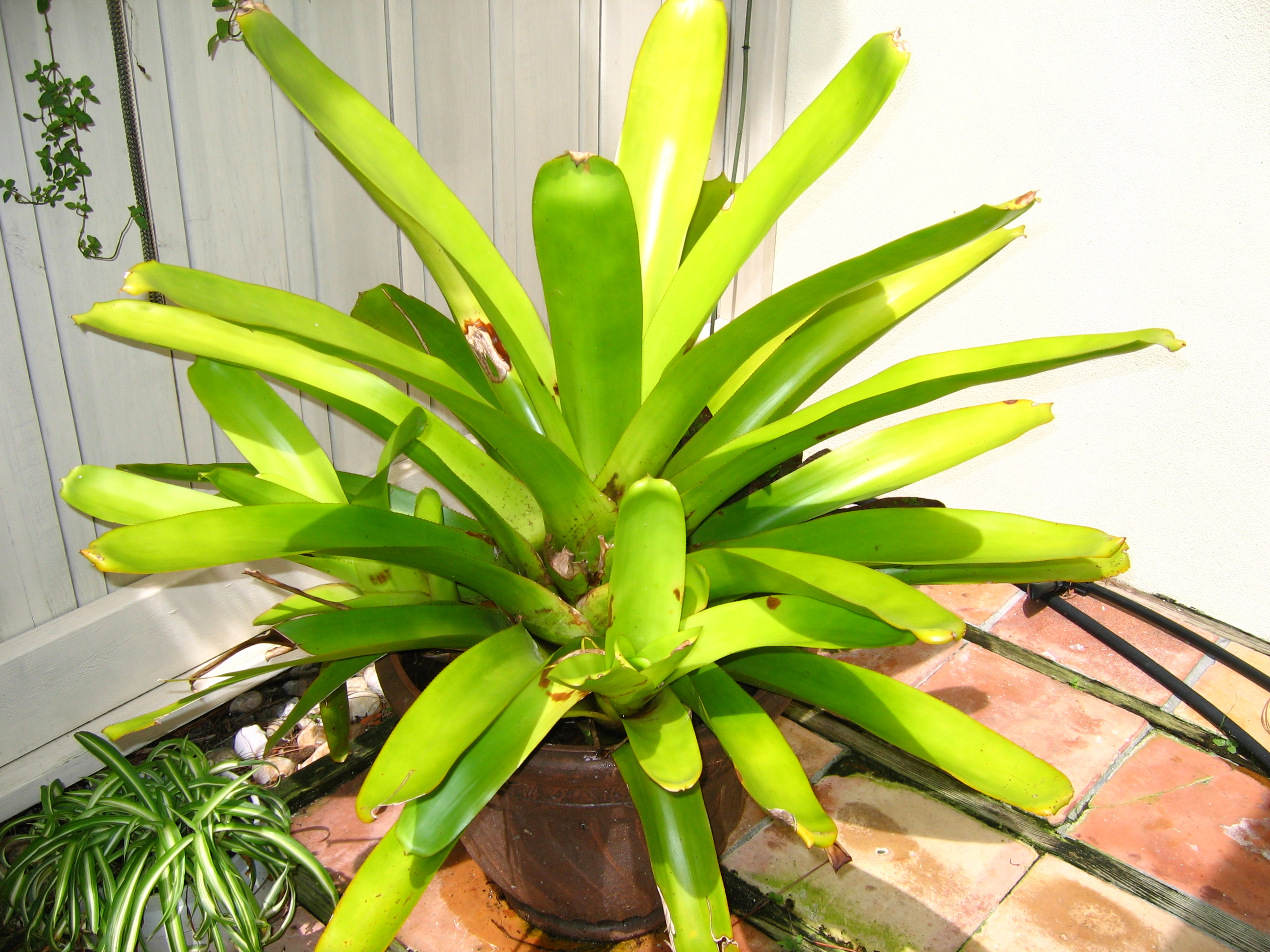
Aechmea blanchetiana growing in Naples, Florida
