= Aproida =

Scientific classification
- Kingdom: Animalia
- Phylum: Arthropoda
- Clade: Pancrustacea
- Class: Insecta
- Order: Coleoptera
- Suborder: Polyphaga
- Infraorder: Cucujiformia
- Family: Chrysomelidae
- Subfamily: Cassidinae
- Tribe: Aproidini; Weise, 1911
- Genus: Aproida; Pascoe, 1863

Genus of leaf beetles

Aproida is a genus of Australian tortoise and leaf-mining beetles (Cassidinae) with three recognized species. It is the only member of the tribe Aproidini.

Aproidini is a monophyletic tribe, found most closely related to Eurispini and Exothispini. The known host plant is Eustrephus latifolius R. Br. Ex Ker-Gawl.

== Species ==
- Aproida balyi Pascoe, 1863
- Aproida cribrata Lea, 1929
- Aproida monteithi Samuelson, 1989
