= Eurispa nigripes =

Scientific classification
- Kingdom: Animalia
- Phylum: Arthropoda
- Clade: Pancrustacea
- Class: Insecta
- Order: Coleoptera
- Suborder: Polyphaga
- Infraorder: Cucujiformia
- Family: Chrysomelidae
- Genus: Eurispa
- Species: E. nigripes

Binomial name
- Eurispa nigripes Blackburn, 1892

Species of beetle

Eurispa nigripes is a species of beetle of the family Chrysomelidae. It is found in Australia, including South Australia.

== Description ==
Adults are similar to Eurispa albipennis and Eurispa howittii. It differs from the latter in colour. Also, the prothorax is not nearly so coarsely and rugulosely punctured, the apical five joints of the antennae are much shorter, and the elytra is a little less strongly produced behind into a tail.

== Life history ==
No host plant has been documented for this species.
