= Eurispa simplex =

Scientific classification
- Kingdom: Animalia
- Phylum: Arthropoda
- Clade: Pancrustacea
- Class: Insecta
- Order: Coleoptera
- Suborder: Polyphaga
- Infraorder: Cucujiformia
- Family: Chrysomelidae
- Genus: Eurispa
- Species: E. simplex

Binomial name
- Eurispa simplex Blackburn, 1892

Species of beetle

Eurispa simplex is a species of beetle of the family Chrysomelidae. It is found in Australia, including Victoria from where it was described.

== Description ==
Adults are similar to Eurispa howittii, but are at once distinguishable by the elytra, which are very much less drawn out at the apex and its antennae which are much shorter, with joints 7–10 transverse and much shorter, and its legs entirely black.

== Life history ==
No host plant has been documented for this species.
