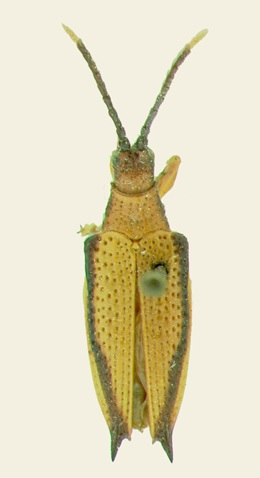

Scientific classification
- Kingdom: Animalia
- Phylum: Arthropoda
- Class: Insecta
- Order: Coleoptera
- Suborder: Polyphaga
- Infraorder: Cucujiformia
- Family: Chrysomelidae
- Genus: Aproida
- Species: A. balyi

Binomial name
- Aproida balyi Pascoe, 1863

Synonyms
- Anisodera thoracica Chapuis, 1876

= Aproida balyi =

Species of beetle

Aproida balyi is a species of beetle of the family Chrysomelidae. It is found in Australia (New South Wales, Queensland).

== Biology ==
They have been recorded feeding on Eustrephus latifolius, Alocasia macrorhoza and Convallaria species.
