= Eurispa fraterna =

Scientific classification
- Kingdom: Animalia
- Phylum: Arthropoda
- Clade: Pancrustacea
- Class: Insecta
- Order: Coleoptera
- Suborder: Polyphaga
- Infraorder: Cucujiformia
- Family: Chrysomelidae
- Genus: Eurispa
- Species: E. fraterna

Binomial name
- Eurispa fraterna Blackburn, 1892

Species of beetle

Eurispa fraterna is a species of beetle of the family Chrysomelidae. It is found in Australia (Northern Territories, Queensland).

== Description ==
Adults are similar to Eurispa major, but differ from it by their smaller size, colouring, less coarse prothoracic punctuation, elytral interstices scarcely convex anteriorly, and especially by the almost truncate base of its prothorax.

== Life history ==
No host plant has been documented for this species.
