= Eurispa subvittata =

Scientific classification
- Kingdom: Animalia
- Phylum: Arthropoda
- Clade: Pancrustacea
- Class: Insecta
- Order: Coleoptera
- Suborder: Polyphaga
- Infraorder: Cucujiformia
- Family: Chrysomelidae
- Genus: Eurispa
- Species: E. subvittata

Binomial name
- Eurispa subvittata Uhmann, 1957

Species of beetle

Eurispa subvittata is a species of beetle of the family Chrysomelidae. It is found in Australia, including West Australia.

== Life history ==
No host plant has been documented for this species.
