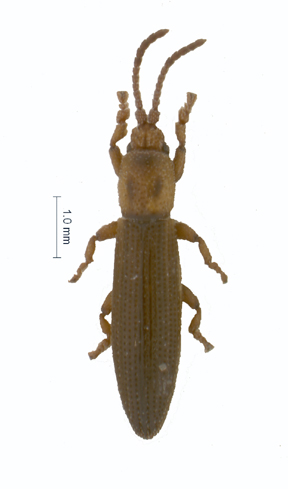

Scientific classification
- Kingdom: Animalia
- Phylum: Arthropoda
- Clade: Pancrustacea
- Class: Insecta
- Order: Coleoptera
- Suborder: Polyphaga
- Infraorder: Cucujiformia
- Family: Chrysomelidae
- Genus: Squamispa
- Species: S. ballapurana

Binomial name
- Squamispa ballapurana Maulik, 1928

= Squamispa ballapurana =

Species of beetle

Squamispa ballapurana is a species of beetle of the family Chrysomelidae. It is found in India.

== Life history ==
No host plant has been documented for this species.
