= Eurispa loriae =

Scientific classification
- Kingdom: Animalia
- Phylum: Arthropoda
- Clade: Pancrustacea
- Class: Insecta
- Order: Coleoptera
- Suborder: Polyphaga
- Infraorder: Cucujiformia
- Family: Chrysomelidae
- Genus: Eurispa
- Species: E. loriae

Binomial name
- Eurispa loriae Gestro, 1892

Species of beetle

Eurispa loriae is a species of beetle of the family Chrysomelidae. It is found in Papua New Guinea.

== Life history ==
No host plant has been documented for this species.
