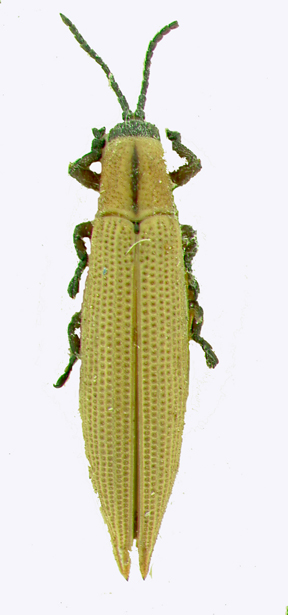

Scientific classification
- Kingdom: Animalia
- Phylum: Arthropoda
- Clade: Pancrustacea
- Class: Insecta
- Order: Coleoptera
- Suborder: Polyphaga
- Infraorder: Cucujiformia
- Family: Chrysomelidae
- Subfamily: Cassidinae
- Tribe: Eurispini
- Genus: Leucispa; Chapuis, 1875
- Species: L. odewahnii

Binomial name
- Leucispa odewahnii (Baly, 1869)

Synonyms
- Eurispa odewahnii Baly, 1869

= Leucispa =

Genus of beetles

Leucispa is a genus of leaf beetles in the family Chrysomelidae. It is monotypic, being represented by the single species, Leucispa odewahnii, which is found in Australia.

== Description ==
The head is coarsely granulose and deeply punctate, the upper surface of the frontal prominence impressed with a deep longitudinal groove. The thorax is one-third longer than broad, narrowed from the base to the apex, with the sides straight, but sinuate just in front of the base and immediately behind the anterior angle. The disc is deeply impressed with large round punctures, each one of which (as well as those on the head) is occupied by a single broadly obovate white scale. The scutellum is shining black. The elytra are scarcely broader than the thorax, nearly parallel, narrowed at the apex, and produced far beyond the extremity of the abdomen into a distinct tail, the apex of each elytron being still further produced into a short, flat, broad, acute spine. The upper surface is subcylindrical, deeply striate-foveolate, each puncture being furnished with a single scale, somewhat narrower than those clothing the head and thorax. Each elytron has four distinct costae, the first and fourth unite just before the apex and form a single costa, which runs onwards until it reaches the apex of the caudal spine, the second and third unite just below the middle of the elytron, and are continued onwards as a single raised line, which gradually becomes less distinct, and is entirely lost before reaching the point of junction of the first pair. The legs are coarsely granulose, clothed, as well as the abdomen, with adpressed obcuneiform scales, those on the tarsi narrow and almost linear.

== Life history ==
No host plant has been documented for this species.
