= Aproida monteithi =

Scientific classification
- Kingdom: Animalia
- Phylum: Arthropoda
- Class: Insecta
- Order: Coleoptera
- Suborder: Polyphaga
- Infraorder: Cucujiformia
- Family: Chrysomelidae
- Genus: Aproida
- Species: A. monteithi

Binomial name
- Aproida monteithi Samuelson, 1989

Species of beetle

Aproida monteithi is a species of beetle of the family Chrysomelidae. It is found in Australia (Queensland).
