= Eurispa yorkiana =

Scientific classification
- Kingdom: Animalia
- Phylum: Arthropoda
- Clade: Pancrustacea
- Class: Insecta
- Order: Coleoptera
- Suborder: Polyphaga
- Infraorder: Cucujiformia
- Family: Chrysomelidae
- Genus: Eurispa
- Species: E. yorkiana

Binomial name
- Eurispa yorkiana Mjöberg, 1917

Species of beetle

Eurispa yorkiana is a species of beetle of the family Chrysomelidae. It is found in Australia (York Island).

== Life history ==
No host plant has been documented for this species.
