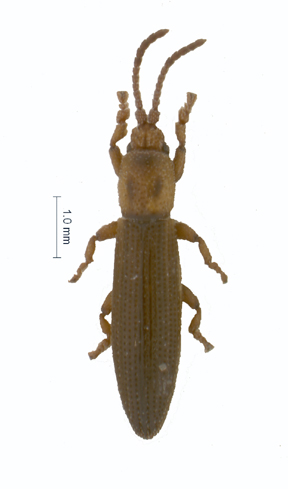
- Squamispa ballapurana

Scientific classification
- Kingdom: Animalia
- Phylum: Arthropoda
- Clade: Pancrustacea
- Class: Insecta
- Order: Coleoptera
- Suborder: Polyphaga
- Infraorder: Cucujiformia
- Family: Chrysomelidae
- Subfamily: Cassidinae
- Tribe: Eurispini
- Genus: Squamispa; Maulik, 1928

= Squamispa =

Genus of leaf beetles

Squamispa is a genus of beetles belonging to the family Chrysomelidae.

== Species ==
- Squamispa ballapurana Maulik, 1928
- Squamispa fasciata Maulik, 1928
