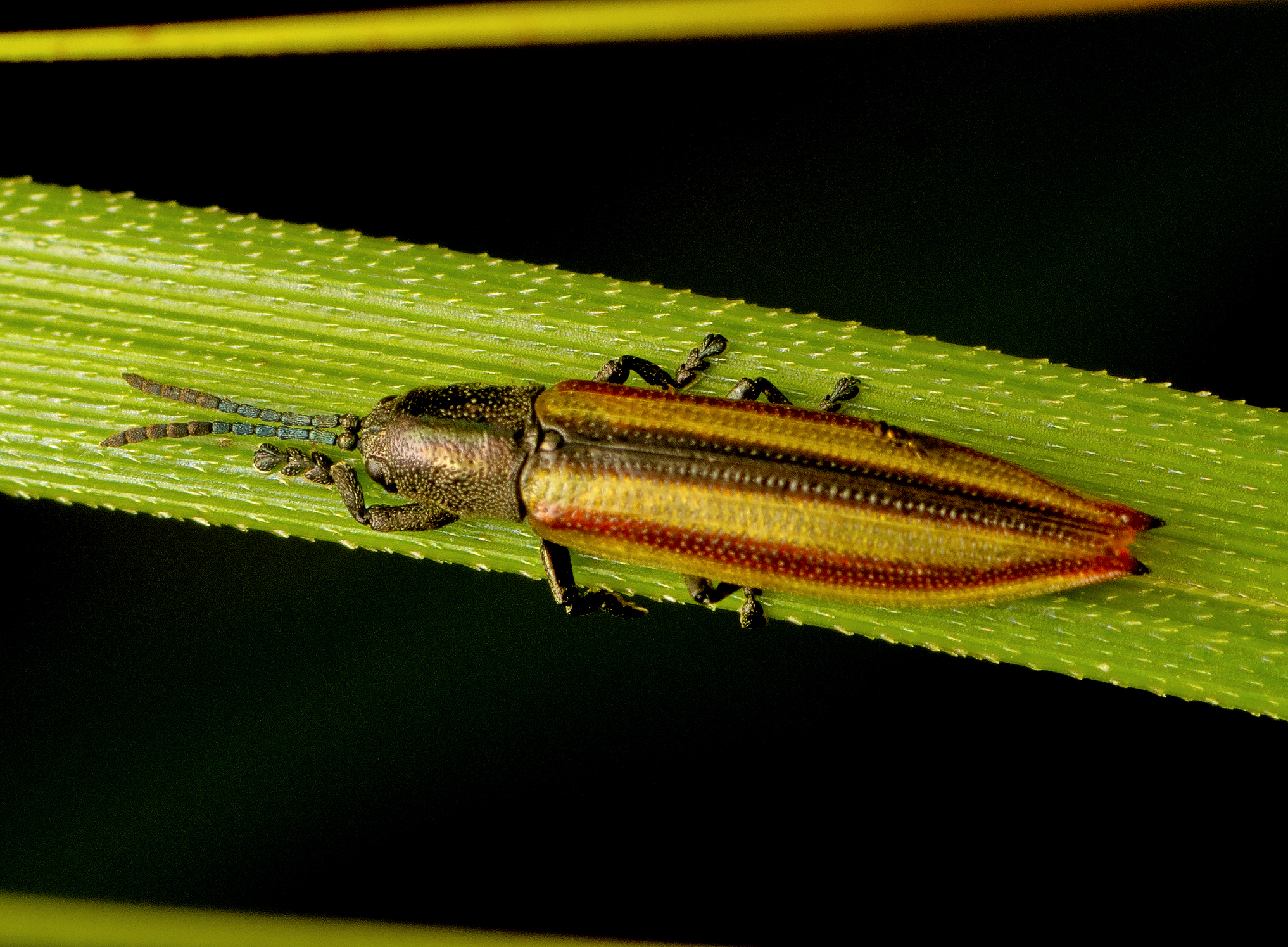
- Eurispa vittata

Scientific classification
- Kingdom: Animalia
- Phylum: Arthropoda
- Clade: Pancrustacea
- Class: Insecta
- Order: Coleoptera
- Suborder: Polyphaga
- Infraorder: Cucujiformia
- Family: Chrysomelidae
- Subfamily: Cassidinae
- Tribe: Eurispini
- Genus: Eurispa; Baly, 1858

= Eurispa =

Genus of leaf beetles

Eurispa is a genus of Australian beetles belonging to the family Chrysomelidae.

== Species ==
- Eurispa albipennis (Germar, 1848)
- Eurispa fraterna Blackburn, 1892
- Eurispa howittii Baly, 1869
- Eurispa loriae Gestro, 1892
- Eurispa major Blackburn, 1888
- Eurispa nigripes Blackburn, 1892
- Eurispa normalis Baly, 1869
- Eurispa simplex Blackburn, 1892
- Eurispa subvittata Uhmann, 1957
- Eurispa turneri Uhmann, 1957
- Eurispa vittata Baly, 1858
- Eurispa yorkiana Mjöberg, 1917
