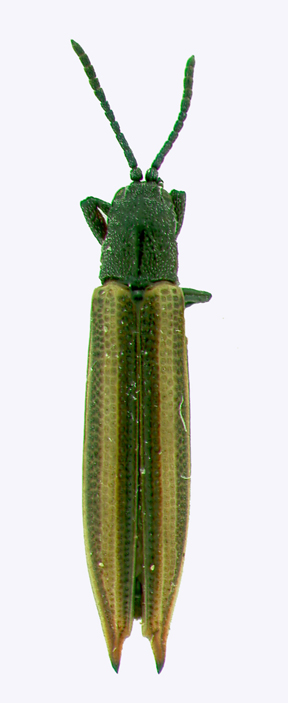

Scientific classification
- Kingdom: Animalia
- Phylum: Arthropoda
- Clade: Pancrustacea
- Class: Insecta
- Order: Coleoptera
- Suborder: Polyphaga
- Infraorder: Cucujiformia
- Family: Chrysomelidae
- Genus: Eurispa
- Species: E. vittata

Binomial name
- Eurispa vittata Baly, 1858

= Eurispa vittata =

Species of beetle

Eurispa vittata is a species of beetle of the family Chrysomelidae. It is found in Australia (New South Wales, Queensland, Tasmania, Victoria).

== Life history ==
The recorded host plants for this species are Gahnia species, including Gahnia sieberiana and Gahnia grandis.
