= Eurispa normalis =

Scientific classification
- Kingdom: Animalia
- Phylum: Arthropoda
- Clade: Pancrustacea
- Class: Insecta
- Order: Coleoptera
- Suborder: Polyphaga
- Infraorder: Cucujiformia
- Family: Chrysomelidae
- Genus: Eurispa
- Species: E. normalis

Binomial name
- Eurispa normalis Baly, 1869

Synonyms
- Eurispa normalis lamingtona Gressitt, 1957

Species of beetle

Eurispa normalis is a species of beetle of the family Chrysomelidae. It is found in Australia (Queensland) and New Guinea.

== Description ==
The body is clothed with adpressed, narrow obcuneiform scales, those on the legs, breast, and abdomen nearly linear. The head between the eyes is scarcely produced and obtuse. The basal half of the antennae is obscure rufo-piceous. The thorax is about one-third longer than broad, cylindrical, scarcely narrowed anteriorly, wit the sides nearly parallel. The surface is deeply foveolate-punctate. The elytra are subcylindrical. The apex of each elytron forms an acute tail.

== Life history ==
No host plant has been documented for this species.
