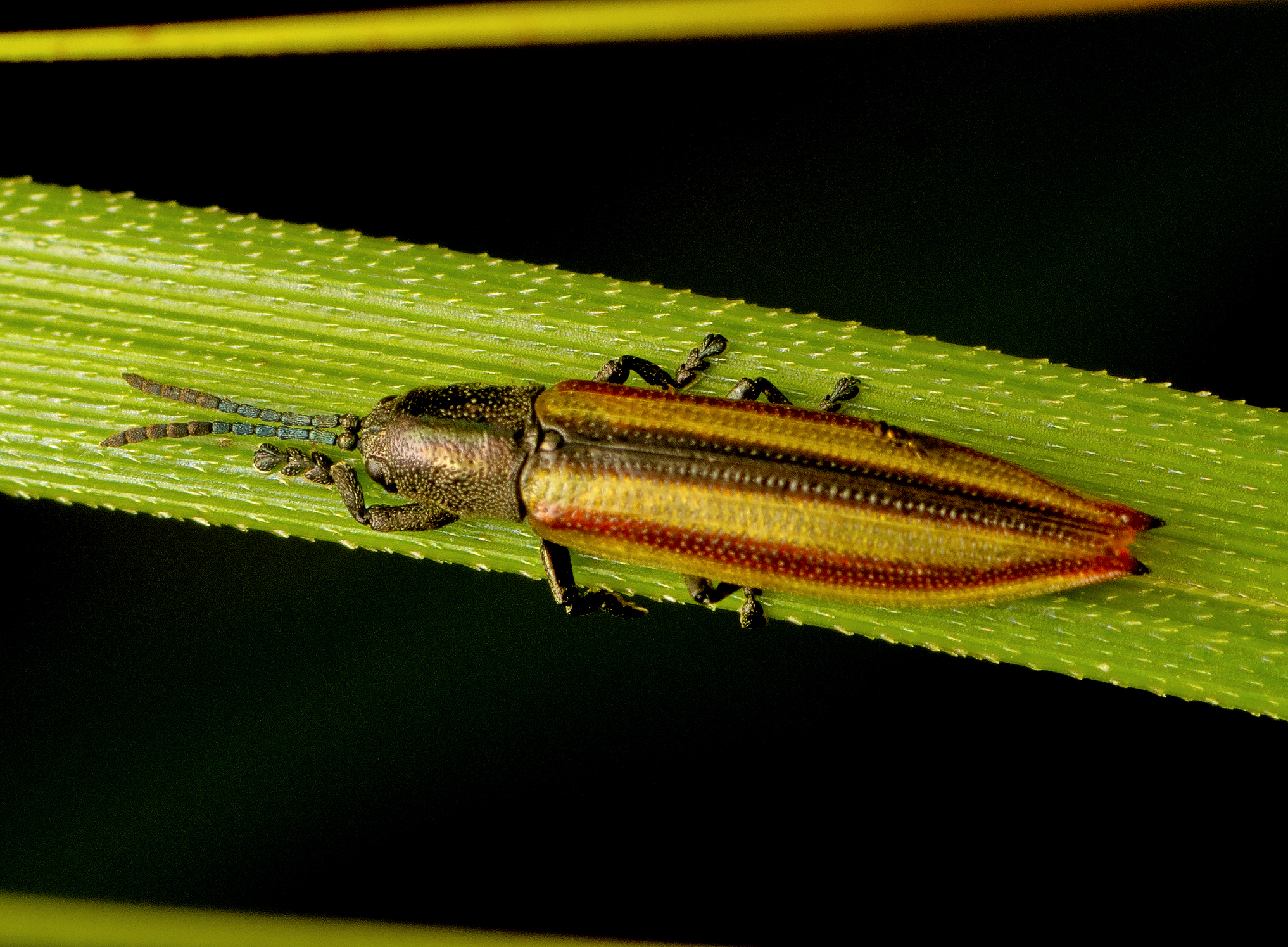
- Eurispa vittata

Scientific classification
- Kingdom: Animalia
- Phylum: Arthropoda
- Class: Insecta
- Order: Coleoptera
- Suborder: Polyphaga
- Infraorder: Cucujiformia
- Family: Chrysomelidae
- Subfamily: Cassidinae
- Tribe: Eurispini; Chapuis, 1875

Genera
- see text

= Eurispini =

Tribe of leaf beetles

Eurispini is a tribe of leaf beetles within the subfamily Cassidinae.

== Genera ==
BioLib includes:

- Eurispa Baly, 1858 - Australasia
- Leucispa Chapuis, 1875 - monotypic Leucispa odewahnii - Australia
- Squamispa Maulik, 1928 - India
