= Eurispa albipennis =

Scientific classification
- Kingdom: Animalia
- Phylum: Arthropoda
- Clade: Pancrustacea
- Class: Insecta
- Order: Coleoptera
- Suborder: Polyphaga
- Infraorder: Cucujiformia
- Family: Chrysomelidae
- Genus: Eurispa
- Species: E. albipennis

Binomial name
- Eurispa albipennis (Germar, 1848)

Synonyms
- Hispa albipennis Germar, 1848

Species of beetle

Eurispa albipennis is a species of beetle of the family Chrysomelidae. It is found in Australia, where it is found along the eastern seaboard.

== Life history ==
The recorded host plants for this species are Juncus species.
