= Eurispa major =

Scientific classification
- Kingdom: Animalia
- Phylum: Arthropoda
- Clade: Pancrustacea
- Class: Insecta
- Order: Coleoptera
- Suborder: Polyphaga
- Infraorder: Cucujiformia
- Family: Chrysomelidae
- Genus: Eurispa
- Species: E. major

Binomial name
- Eurispa major Blackburn, 1888

Species of beetle

Eurispa major is a species of beetle of the family Chrysomelidae. It is found in Australia (South Australia).

== Life history ==
No host plant has been documented for this species.
