= Eurispa howittii =

Scientific classification
- Kingdom: Animalia
- Phylum: Arthropoda
- Clade: Pancrustacea
- Class: Insecta
- Order: Coleoptera
- Suborder: Polyphaga
- Infraorder: Cucujiformia
- Family: Chrysomelidae
- Genus: Eurispa
- Species: E. howittii

Binomial name
- Eurispa howittii Baly, 1869

Species of beetle

Eurispa howittii is a species of beetle of the family Chrysomelidae. It is found in Australia (Queensland).

== Description ==
The body is clothed with adpressed, narrow, white obcunei-form scales, those on the legs linear. The thorax is nearly a third longer than broad and subconic, the sides slightly converging from the base to the apex. The upper surface is less closely punctured than in related Eurispa normalis and the lateral border is slightly thickened and white. The elytra are attenuated at the apex, each produced into a long acute tail. The surface is deeply striate-foveolate, with the interspaces behind the middle costate, the costae uniting near the apex of the elytron into a single strongly raised ridge, which runs along the caudal spine to its apex.

== Life history ==
No host plant has been documented for this species.
