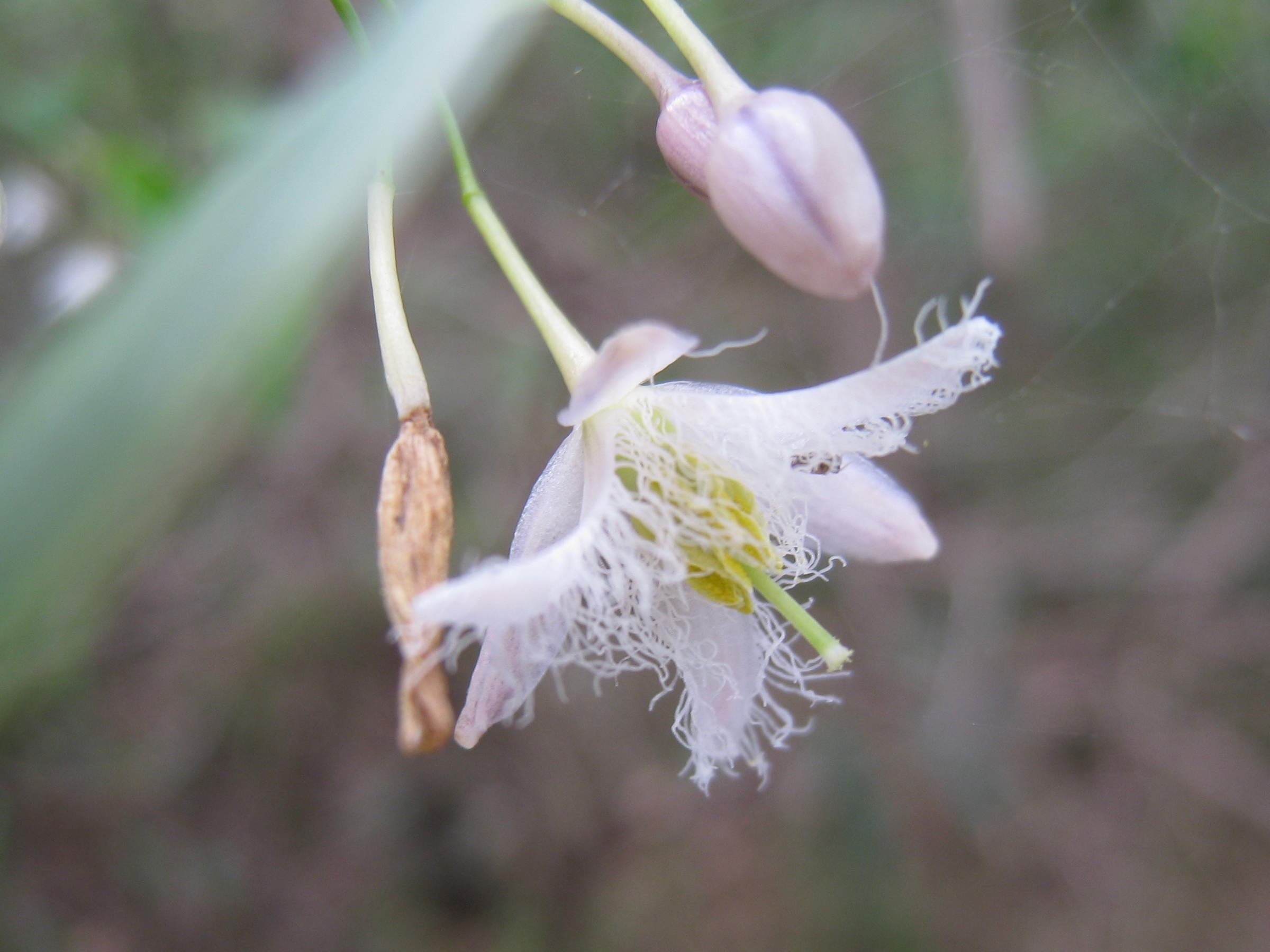
- Flowers

Conservation status
- Least Concern (NCA)

Scientific classification
- Kingdom: Plantae
- Clade: Tracheophytes
- Clade: Angiosperms
- Clade: Monocots
- Order: Asparagales
- Family: Asparagaceae
- Subfamily: Lomandroideae
- Genus: Eustrephus; R.Br.
- Species: E. latifolius

Binomial name
- Eustrephus latifolius R.Br.

= Eustrephus =

Genus of flowering plants

Eustrephus is a monotypic genus (i.e. a genus that contains a single species) in the family Asparagaceae, subfamily Lomandroideae. The sole species is Eustrephus latifolius, commonly known as wombat berry. It is an evergreen vine native to Malesia, the Pacific Islands and eastern Australia. It grows in sclerophyll forest, woodland, heathlands, shrublands, gallery forest and rainforests.

The leaves are highly variable in shape, elliptic to linear, 30–100 mm (1.2–3.9 in) long and 3–35 mm (0.12–1.38 in) wide. All leaf veins are equally distinct. Flowers are pink to mauve or white. The yellow-orange, globose, capsules are 1–2 cm (0.4–0.8 in) diameter and contain numerous black seeds partly enclosed in a white aril. The variation in the shapes of the leaves has resulted in the creation of numerous infraspecific taxa over the years, none of which are recognised by most present-day systematists.

== Uses ==
The tubers are edible and have a sweet flavour. The 1889 book The Useful Native Plants of Australia records that this plant "produces sweet though only small tubers, which, however, are probably capable of enlargement through culture (Mueller)."

== Gallery ==
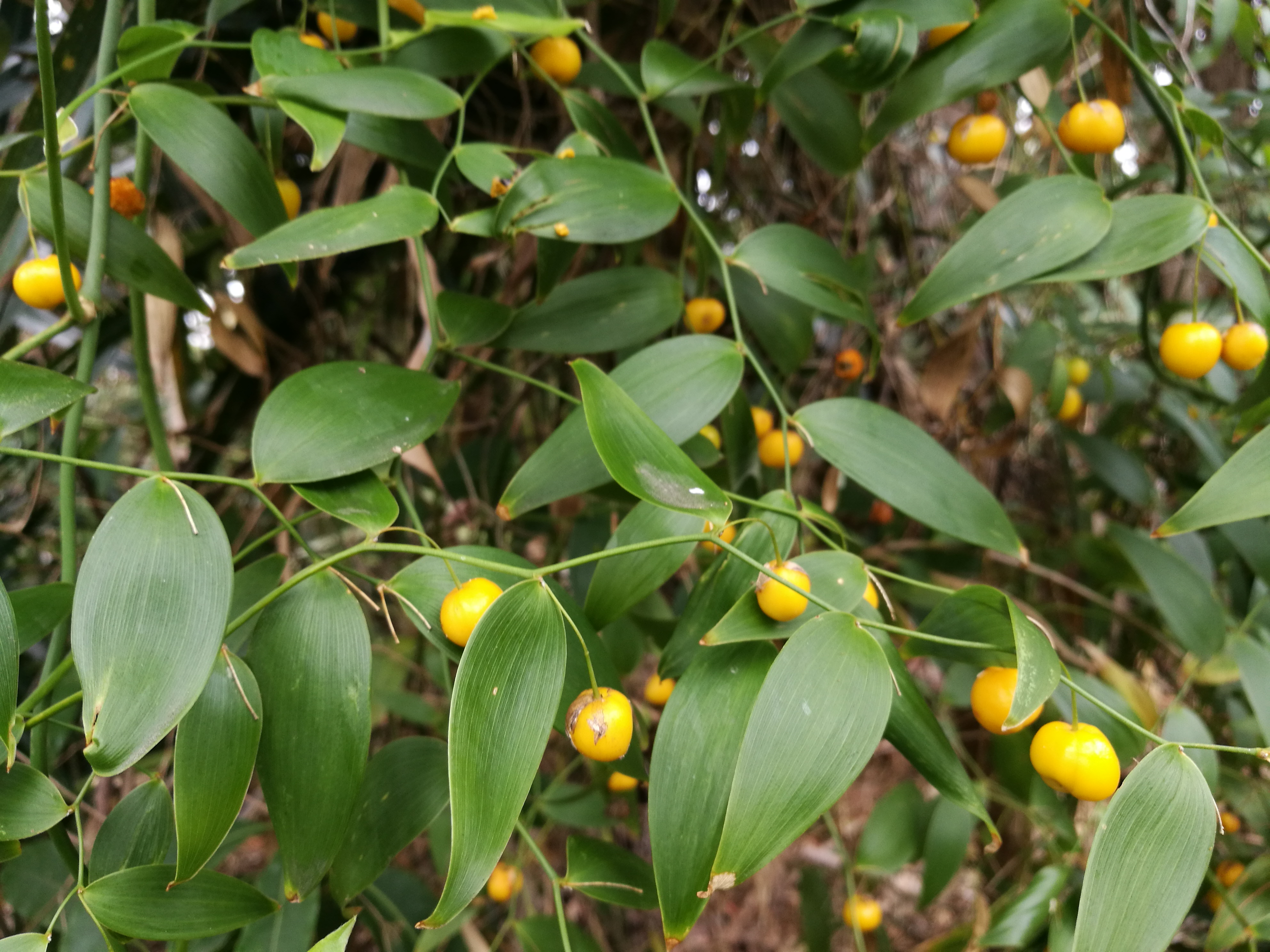
Foliage and fruit

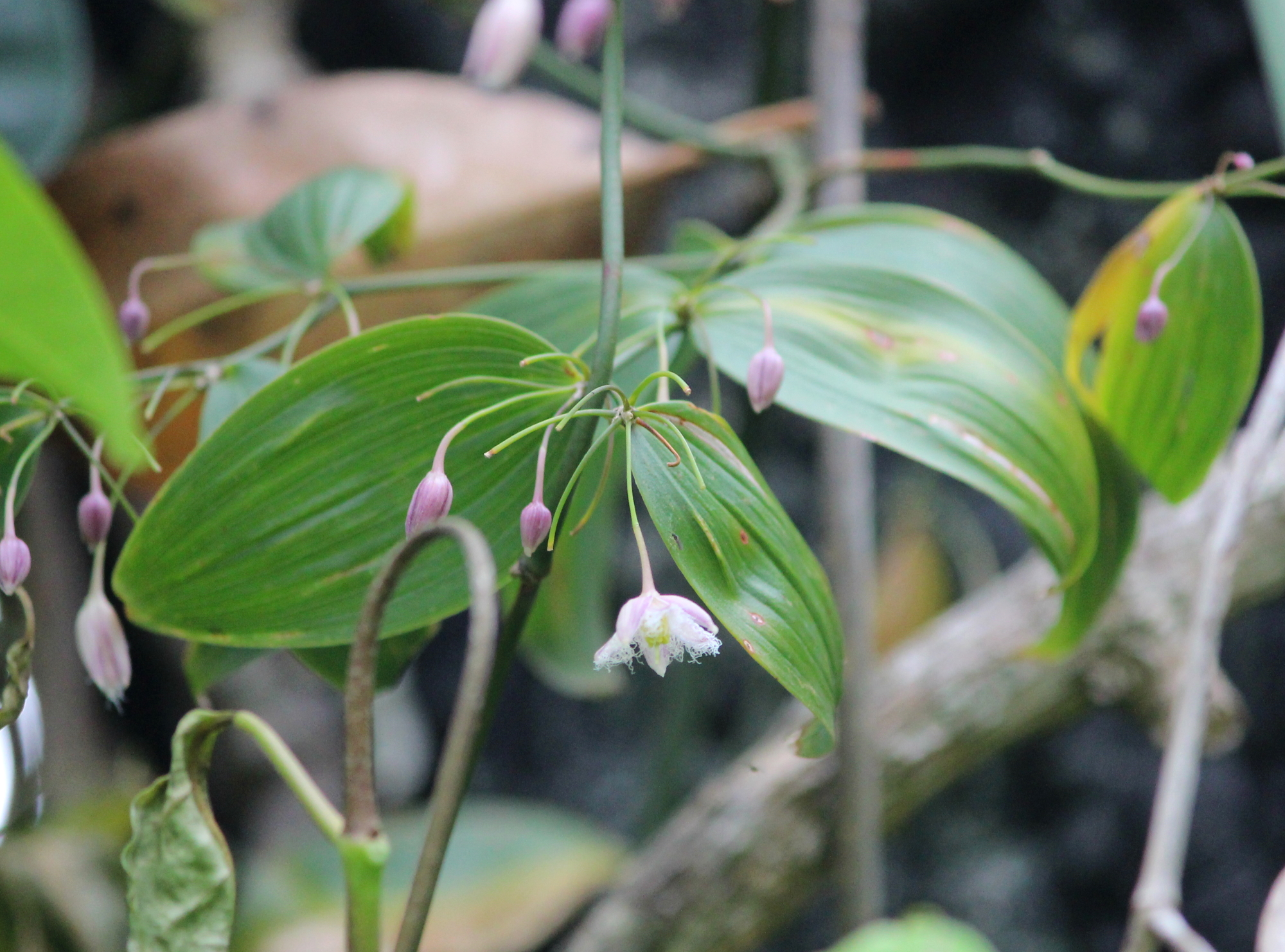
Flowers, and very broad leaves

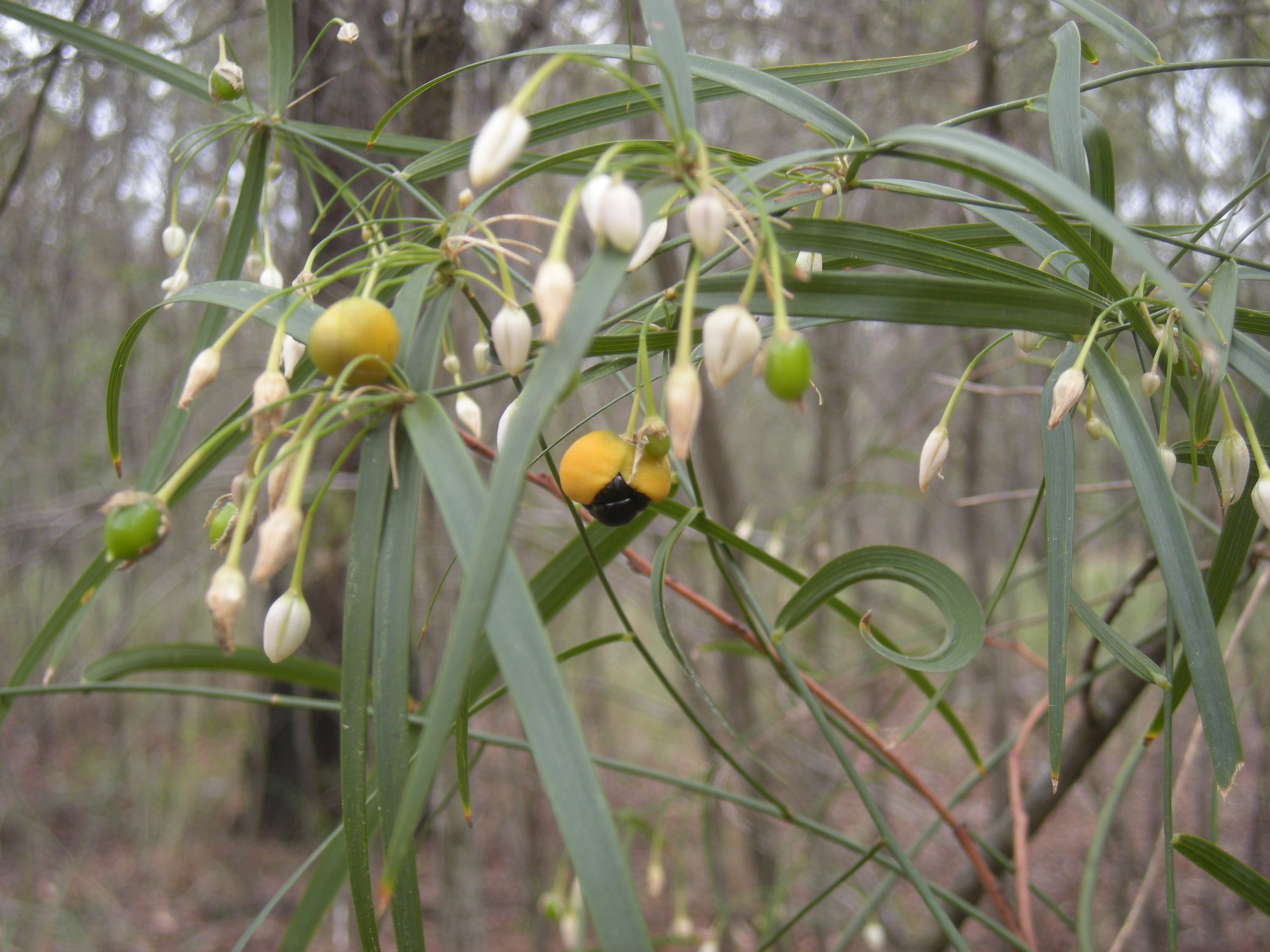
Plant with long narrow leaves

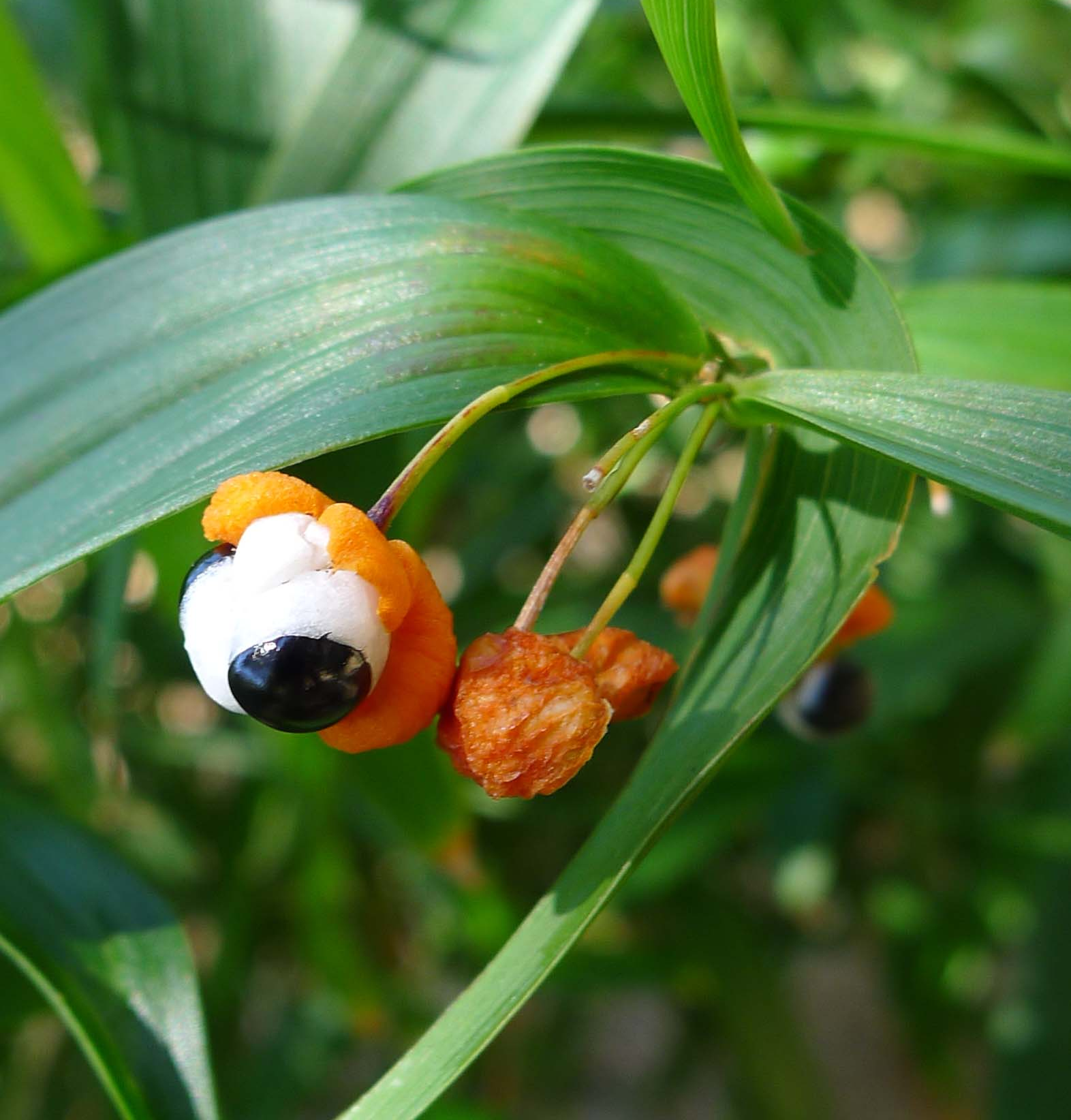
Fruit: black seed in white aril
