= Bothryonopa cyanoptera =

Scientific classification
- Kingdom: Animalia
- Phylum: Arthropoda
- Clade: Pancrustacea
- Class: Insecta
- Order: Coleoptera
- Suborder: Polyphaga
- Infraorder: Cucujiformia
- Family: Chrysomelidae
- Genus: Bothryonopa
- Species: B. cyanoptera

Binomial name
- Bothryonopa cyanoptera Baly, 1869

Synonyms
- Botryonopa minor Uhmann, 1930; Botryonopa angustata Uhmann, 1931

Species of beetle

Bothryonopa cyanoptera is a species of chrysomelid beetle that belongs to the tribe Bothryonopini. It is found in Indonesia (Borneo), Malaysia and the Philippines (Mindanao).

This species was described in 1869 by Joseph Sugar Baly, an English entomologist known for describing a number of species within Chrysomelidae.
