= Neodownesia rubra =

Scientific classification
- Kingdom: Animalia
- Phylum: Arthropoda
- Clade: Pancrustacea
- Class: Insecta
- Order: Coleoptera
- Suborder: Polyphaga
- Infraorder: Cucujiformia
- Family: Chrysomelidae
- Genus: Neodownesia
- Species: N. rubra

Binomial name
- Neodownesia rubra Gressitt, 1953

Species of beetle

Neodownesia rubra is a species of beetle of the family Chrysomelidae. It is found in China (Fujian).
