= Bothryonopa delkeskampi =

Scientific classification
- Kingdom: Animalia
- Phylum: Arthropoda
- Clade: Pancrustacea
- Class: Insecta
- Order: Coleoptera
- Suborder: Polyphaga
- Infraorder: Cucujiformia
- Family: Chrysomelidae
- Genus: Bothryonopa
- Species: B. delkeskampi

Binomial name
- Bothryonopa delkeskampi Uhmann, 1960

Species of beetle

Bothryonopa delkeskampi is a species of beetle in the family Chrysomelidae. It is found in Malaysia.
