= Bothryonopa sungkita =

Scientific classification
- Kingdom: Animalia
- Phylum: Arthropoda
- Clade: Pancrustacea
- Class: Insecta
- Order: Coleoptera
- Suborder: Polyphaga
- Infraorder: Cucujiformia
- Family: Chrysomelidae
- Genus: Bothryonopa
- Species: B. sungkita

Binomial name
- Bothryonopa sungkita Würmli, 1976

Species of beetle

Bothryonopa sungkita is a species of beetle in the family Chrysomelidae. It is found in Indonesia (Borneo) and Malaysia.
