= Bothryonopa modiglianii =

Scientific classification
- Kingdom: Animalia
- Phylum: Arthropoda
- Clade: Pancrustacea
- Class: Insecta
- Order: Coleoptera
- Suborder: Polyphaga
- Infraorder: Cucujiformia
- Family: Chrysomelidae
- Genus: Bothryonopa
- Species: B. modiglianii

Binomial name
- Bothryonopa modiglianii (Gestro, 1896)

Synonyms
- List: Hispopria modiglianii Gestro, 1896; Hispopria apicalis Gestro, 1901; Botryonopa apicalis vittata Uhmann, 1935; Botryonopa apicalis uniformis Uhmann, 1935; Botryonopa korinchica Uhmann, 1951

Species of beetle

Bothryonopa modiglianii is a species of beetle in the family Chrysomelidae. It is found in Indonesia (Java, Sumatra).
