= Neodownesia =

Scientific classification
- Kingdom: Animalia
- Phylum: Arthropoda
- Clade: Pancrustacea
- Class: Insecta
- Order: Coleoptera
- Suborder: Polyphaga
- Infraorder: Cucujiformia
- Family: Chrysomelidae
- Subfamily: Cassidinae
- Tribe: Bothryonopini
- Genus: Neodownesia; Gressitt, 1953

Genus of leaf beetles

Neodownesia is a genus of beetles belonging to the family Chrysomelidae.

== Species ==
- Neodownesia mediovittata (Gestro, 1920)
- Neodownesia rubra Gressitt, 1953
- Neodownesia sita (Maulik, 1919)
