= Bothryonopa =

- Botryonopa sheppardi

Scientific classification
- Kingdom: Animalia
- Phylum: Arthropoda
- Class: Insecta
- Order: Coleoptera
- Suborder: Polyphaga
- Infraorder: Cucujiformia
- Family: Chrysomelidae
- Subfamily: Cassidinae
- Tribe: Bothryonopini
- Genus: Bothryonopa; Guérin-Méneville, 1840

Synonyms
- Hispopria Baly, 1858; Botryonopa (orthographic variant)

Genus of leaf beetles

Bothryonopa is a genus of Asian beetles belonging to the family Chrysomelidae.

== Species ==
- Bothryonopa angustata Uhmann, 1931
- Bothryonopa bicolor Uhmann, 1927
- Bothryonopa bipartita (Pic, 1927)
- Bothryonopa bipunctata (Baly, 1858)
- Bothryonopa collaris Weise, 1911
- Bothryonopa concinna (Gestro, 1901)
- Bothryonopa crassicornis Gestro, 1897
- Bothryonopa cyanipennis Baly, 1858
- Bothryonopa cyanoptera Baly, 1869
- Bothryonopa daiacca Würmli, 1976
- Bothryonopa delkeskampi Uhmann, 1960
- Bothryonopa dohrni (Gestro, 1897)
- Bothryonopa foveicollis (Baly, 1858)
- Bothryonopa grandis (Baly, 1858)
- Bothryonopa helena Würmli, 1976
- Bothryonopa imperalis Baly, 1869
- Bothryonopa ingens Gestro, 1903
- Bothryonopa jacobii Uhmann, 1930
- Bothryonopa javana Uhmann, 1928
- Bothryonopa mindoroica Uhmann, 1930
- Bothryonopa misella Gestro, 1917
- Bothryonopa modiglianii (Gestro, 1896)
- Bothryonopa obscura Würmli, 1976
- Bothryonopa piliha Würmli, 1976
- Bothryonopa punctatissima (Chapuis, 1876)
- Bothryonopa purpurascens Chapuis, 1876
- Bothryonopa sahyadrica Shameem & Prathapan, 2019
- Bothryonopa sanguinea Guérin-Méneville, 1840
- Bothryonopa schultzei Uhmann, 1930
- Bothryonopa sheppardi Baly, 1858
- Bothryonopa spectabilis Baly, 1858
- Bothryonopa sungkita Würmli, 1976
- Bothryonopa terminalis (Baly, 1876)
- Bothryonopa tobae Gestro, 1897
