= Bothryonopa obscura =

Scientific classification
- Kingdom: Animalia
- Phylum: Arthropoda
- Clade: Pancrustacea
- Class: Insecta
- Order: Coleoptera
- Suborder: Polyphaga
- Infraorder: Cucujiformia
- Family: Chrysomelidae
- Genus: Bothryonopa
- Species: B. obscura

Binomial name
- Bothryonopa obscura Würmli, 1976

Species of beetle

Bothryonopa obscura is a species of beetle in the family Chrysomelidae. It is found in the Philippines (Palawan).
