= Bothryonopa angustata =

Scientific classification
- Kingdom: Animalia
- Phylum: Arthropoda
- Clade: Pancrustacea
- Class: Insecta
- Order: Coleoptera
- Suborder: Polyphaga
- Infraorder: Cucujiformia
- Family: Chrysomelidae
- Genus: Bothryonopa
- Species: B. angustata

Binomial name
- Bothryonopa angustata Uhmann, 1931

Synonyms
- Botryonopa angustata quadrata Uhmann, 1933

Species of beetle

Bothryonopa angustata is a species of beetle of the family Chrysomelidae. It is found in the Philippines (Mindanao).
