= Pistosia maculata =

Scientific classification
- Kingdom: Animalia
- Phylum: Arthropoda
- Clade: Pancrustacea
- Class: Insecta
- Order: Coleoptera
- Suborder: Polyphaga
- Infraorder: Cucujiformia
- Family: Chrysomelidae
- Genus: Pistosia
- Species: P. maculata

Binomial name
- Pistosia maculata Weise, 1905

Synonyms
- Wallacea maculata

Species of beetle

Pistosia maculata is a species of beetle in the family Chrysomelidae. It is found in Indonesia (Sulawesi).
