= Bothryonopa bipunctata =

Scientific classification
- Kingdom: Animalia
- Phylum: Arthropoda
- Clade: Pancrustacea
- Class: Insecta
- Order: Coleoptera
- Suborder: Polyphaga
- Infraorder: Cucujiformia
- Family: Chrysomelidae
- Genus: Bothryonopa
- Species: B. bipunctata

Binomial name
- Bothryonopa bipunctata (Baly, 1858)

Synonyms
- Hispopria bipunctata Baly, 1858

Species of beetle

Bothryonopa bipunctata is a species of beetle in the family Chrysomelidae. It is found in the Philippines (Mindanao, Mindoro, Negros, Palawan).
