= Bothryonopa concinna =

Scientific classification
- Kingdom: Animalia
- Phylum: Arthropoda
- Clade: Pancrustacea
- Class: Insecta
- Order: Coleoptera
- Suborder: Polyphaga
- Infraorder: Cucujiformia
- Family: Chrysomelidae
- Genus: Bothryonopa
- Species: B. concinna

Binomial name
- Bothryonopa concinna (Gestro, 1901)

Synonyms
- Hispopria concinna Gestro, 1901; Bothryonopa cyanipennis Weise, 1905 (not Baly, 1858); Botryonopa moultonii Gestro, 1913

Species of beetle

Bothryonopa concinna is a species of beetle in the family Chrysomelidae. It is found in Indonesia (Borneo, Kalimantan) and Malaysia.
