= Bothryonopa grandis =

Scientific classification
- Kingdom: Animalia
- Phylum: Arthropoda
- Clade: Pancrustacea
- Class: Insecta
- Order: Coleoptera
- Suborder: Polyphaga
- Infraorder: Cucujiformia
- Family: Chrysomelidae
- Genus: Bothryonopa
- Species: B. grandis

Binomial name
- Bothryonopa grandis (Baly, 1858)

Synonyms
- Hispopria grandis Baly, 1858; Botryonopa marginata Uhmann, 1927

Species of beetle

Bothryonopa grandis is a species of beetle in the family Chrysomelidae. It is found in Indonesia (Borneo, Java, Sumatra) and Malaysia.

== Biology ==
Bothryonopa grandis feeds on Metroxylon species.
