= Bothryonopa misella =

Scientific classification
- Kingdom: Animalia
- Phylum: Arthropoda
- Clade: Pancrustacea
- Class: Insecta
- Order: Coleoptera
- Suborder: Polyphaga
- Infraorder: Cucujiformia
- Family: Chrysomelidae
- Genus: Bothryonopa
- Species: B. misella

Binomial name
- Bothryonopa misella Gestro, 1917

Synonyms
- Botryonopa musella

Species of beetle

Bothryonopa misella is a species of beetle in the family Chrysomelidae. It is found in Malaysia and the Philippines (Mindanao).
