= Bothryonopa cyanipennis =

Scientific classification
- Kingdom: Animalia
- Phylum: Arthropoda
- Clade: Pancrustacea
- Class: Insecta
- Order: Coleoptera
- Suborder: Polyphaga
- Infraorder: Cucujiformia
- Family: Chrysomelidae
- Genus: Bothryonopa
- Species: B. cyanipennis

Binomial name
- Bothryonopa cyanipennis Baly, 1858

Synonyms
- Botryonopa nobilis Gestro, 1897; Botryonopa opacicollis Baly

Species of beetle

Bothryonopa cyanipennis is a species of beetle in the family Chrysomelidae. It is found in Indonesia (Borneo, Java, Sumatra), Malaysia and New Guinea.
