= Bothryonopa dohrni =

Scientific classification
- Kingdom: Animalia
- Phylum: Arthropoda
- Clade: Pancrustacea
- Class: Insecta
- Order: Coleoptera
- Suborder: Polyphaga
- Infraorder: Cucujiformia
- Family: Chrysomelidae
- Genus: Bothryonopa
- Species: B. dohrni

Binomial name
- Bothryonopa dohrni (Gestro, 1897)

Synonyms
- Hispopria dohrni Gestro, 1897

Species of beetle

Bothryonopa dohrni is a species of beetle in the family Chrysomelidae. It is found in Indonesia (Sumatra).
