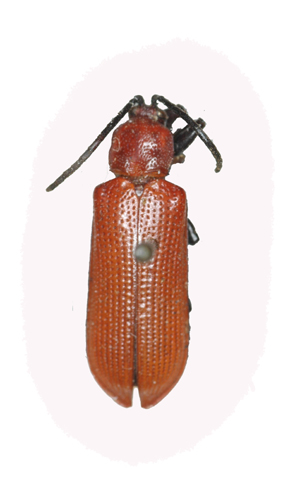

Scientific classification
- Kingdom: Animalia
- Phylum: Arthropoda
- Clade: Pancrustacea
- Class: Insecta
- Order: Coleoptera
- Suborder: Polyphaga
- Infraorder: Cucujiformia
- Family: Chrysomelidae
- Genus: Bothryonopa
- Species: B. sanguinea

Binomial name
- Bothryonopa sanguinea Guérin-Méneville, 1840

Synonyms
- Botryonopa dentipes Chevrolat, 1836 (nomen nudum); Botryonopa papaverata Dejean, 1836 (nomen nudum)

= Bothryonopa sanguinea =

Species of beetle

Bothryonopa sanguinea is a species of beetle in the family Chrysomelidae. It is found in northern India, Indonesia (Java, Sumatra), Laos and Malaysia.

== Biology ==
They have been recorded feeding on Cocos nucifera and Metroxylon species.
