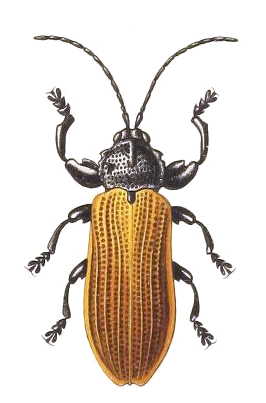

Scientific classification
- Kingdom: Animalia
- Phylum: Arthropoda
- Clade: Pancrustacea
- Class: Insecta
- Order: Coleoptera
- Suborder: Polyphaga
- Infraorder: Cucujiformia
- Family: Chrysomelidae
- Genus: Bothryonopa
- Species: B. foveicollis

Binomial name
- Bothryonopa foveicollis (Baly, 1858)

Synonyms
- List: Hispopria foveicollis Baly, 1858; Hispopria geniculata Baly, 1858; Botryonopa crenata Chapuis, 1876; Botryonopa crassipes Motschulsky, 1861; Hispopria opaca Weise, 1910

= Bothryonopa foveicollis =

Species of beetle

Bothryonopa foveicollis is a species of beetle of the family Chrysomelidae. It is found in the Philippines (Biliran, Luzon, Mindanao, Samar).
