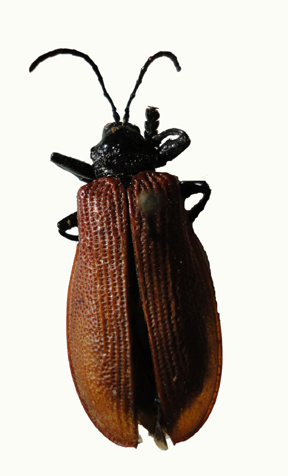

Scientific classification
- Kingdom: Animalia
- Phylum: Arthropoda
- Clade: Pancrustacea
- Class: Insecta
- Order: Coleoptera
- Suborder: Polyphaga
- Infraorder: Cucujiformia
- Family: Chrysomelidae
- Subfamily: Cassidinae
- Tribe: Bothryonopini
- Genus: Macrispa; Baly, 1858
- Species: M. saundersii

Binomial name
- Macrispa saundersii Baly, 1858

Synonyms
- Botryonopa saundersii; Macrispa krishnalohita Maulik, 1915

= Macrispa =

Genus of beetles

Macrispa is a genus of leaf beetles in the family Chrysomelidae. It is monotypic, being represented by the single species, Macrispa saundersii, which is found in Bangladesh, Bhutan and India (Assam, Bengal, Meghalaya).
