= Pistosia testacea =

Scientific classification
- Kingdom: Animalia
- Phylum: Arthropoda
- Clade: Pancrustacea
- Class: Insecta
- Order: Coleoptera
- Suborder: Polyphaga
- Infraorder: Cucujiformia
- Family: Chrysomelidae
- Genus: Pistosia
- Species: P. testacea

Binomial name
- Pistosia testacea (Fabricius, 1801)

Synonyms
- Alurnus testaceus Fabricius, 1801

Species of beetle

Pistosia testacea is a species of beetle in the family Chrysomelidae. It is found in Indonesia (Sulawesi).
