= Bothryonopa crassicornis =

Scientific classification
- Kingdom: Animalia
- Phylum: Arthropoda
- Clade: Pancrustacea
- Class: Insecta
- Order: Coleoptera
- Suborder: Polyphaga
- Infraorder: Cucujiformia
- Family: Chrysomelidae
- Genus: Bothryonopa
- Species: B. crassicornis

Binomial name
- Bothryonopa crassicornis Gestro, 1897

Synonyms
- Botryonopa wegneri Uhmann, 1960; Botryonopa crassicornis ikata Würmli, 1976; Botryonopa tamiangana Uhmann, 1930

Species of beetle

Bothryonopa crassicornis is a species of beetle in the family Chrysomelidae. It is found in Indonesia (Borneo, Sumatra) and Malaysia.
