= Neodownesia mediovittata =

Scientific classification
- Kingdom: Animalia
- Phylum: Arthropoda
- Clade: Pancrustacea
- Class: Insecta
- Order: Coleoptera
- Suborder: Polyphaga
- Infraorder: Cucujiformia
- Family: Chrysomelidae
- Genus: Neodownesia
- Species: N. mediovittata

Binomial name
- Neodownesia mediovittata (Gestro, 1920)

Synonyms
- Anisoderopsis mediovittata Gestro, 1920

Species of beetle

Neodownesia mediovittata is a species of beetle of the family Chrysomelidae. It is found in Laos and Thailand.
