= Bothryonopa sahyadrica =

Scientific classification
- Kingdom: Animalia
- Phylum: Arthropoda
- Clade: Pancrustacea
- Class: Insecta
- Order: Coleoptera
- Suborder: Polyphaga
- Infraorder: Cucujiformia
- Family: Chrysomelidae
- Genus: Bothryonopa
- Species: B. sahyadrica

Binomial name
- Bothryonopa sahyadrica Shameem & Prathapan, 2019

Species of beetle

Bothryonopa sahyadrica is a species of beetle of the family Chrysomelidae. It is found in India (Kerala).

== Description ==
Adults reach a length of about 9.08–13.15 mm. They generally have a rufous brown to piceous head, pronotum and elytron, but are highly variable in colour.

== Biology ==
Adults have been found on the leaves of Calamus gamblei.

== Etymology ==
The species name refers to Sahyadri, the Sanskrit name of the Western Ghats chain of mountains, where the species lives.
