= Bothryonopa bipartita =

Scientific classification
- Kingdom: Animalia
- Phylum: Arthropoda
- Clade: Pancrustacea
- Class: Insecta
- Order: Coleoptera
- Suborder: Polyphaga
- Infraorder: Cucujiformia
- Family: Chrysomelidae
- Genus: Bothryonopa
- Species: B. bipartita

Binomial name
- Bothryonopa bipartita (Pic, 1927)

Synonyms
- Macrispa bipartita Pic, 1927

Species of beetle

Bothryonopa bipartita is a species of beetle in the family Chrysomelidae. It is found in Vietnam.
