= Neodownesia sita =

Scientific classification
- Kingdom: Animalia
- Phylum: Arthropoda
- Clade: Pancrustacea
- Class: Insecta
- Order: Coleoptera
- Suborder: Polyphaga
- Infraorder: Cucujiformia
- Family: Chrysomelidae
- Genus: Neodownesia
- Species: N. sita

Binomial name
- Neodownesia sita (Maulik, 1919)

Synonyms
- Wallacea sita Maulik, 1919

Species of beetle

Neodownesia sita is a species of beetle of the family Chrysomelidae. It is found in Myanmar and Thailand.
