= Bothryonopa spectabilis =

Scientific classification
- Kingdom: Animalia
- Phylum: Arthropoda
- Clade: Pancrustacea
- Class: Insecta
- Order: Coleoptera
- Suborder: Polyphaga
- Infraorder: Cucujiformia
- Family: Chrysomelidae
- Genus: Bothryonopa
- Species: B. spectabilis

Binomial name
- Bothryonopa spectabilis Baly, 1858

Synonyms
- List: Botryonopa nitidicollis Gestro, 1897; Botryonopa helleri Heyden, 1897; Botryonopa dulitana Uhmann, 1938; Botryonopa kleinei Uhmann, 1931; Botryonopa spectabilis stomachosa Würmli, 1976

Species of beetle

Bothryonopa spectabilis is a species of beetle in the family Chrysomelidae. It is found in Indonesia (Borneo, Sumatra) and Malaysia.

== Biology ==
They have been recorded feeding on Oncosperma horridum, Eugeissona tristis and Daemonorops geniculatus.
