= Bothryonopa sheppardi =

Scientific classification
- Kingdom: Animalia
- Phylum: Arthropoda
- Clade: Pancrustacea
- Class: Insecta
- Order: Coleoptera
- Suborder: Polyphaga
- Infraorder: Cucujiformia
- Family: Chrysomelidae
- Genus: Bothryonopa
- Species: B. sheppardi

Binomial name
- Bothryonopa sheppardi Baly, 1858

Species of beetle

Bothryonopa sheppardi is a species of beetle in the family Chrysomelidae. It is found in Bangladesh, Bhutan, India (Assam, Arunachal Pradesh, Sikkim, West Bengal), Laos, Myanmar and Thailand.
