= Bothryonopa helena =

Scientific classification
- Kingdom: Animalia
- Phylum: Arthropoda
- Clade: Pancrustacea
- Class: Insecta
- Order: Coleoptera
- Suborder: Polyphaga
- Infraorder: Cucujiformia
- Family: Chrysomelidae
- Genus: Bothryonopa
- Species: B. helena

Binomial name
- Bothryonopa helena Würmli, 1976

Species of beetle

Bothryonopa helena is a species of beetle in the family Chrysomelidae. It is found in Malaysia.
