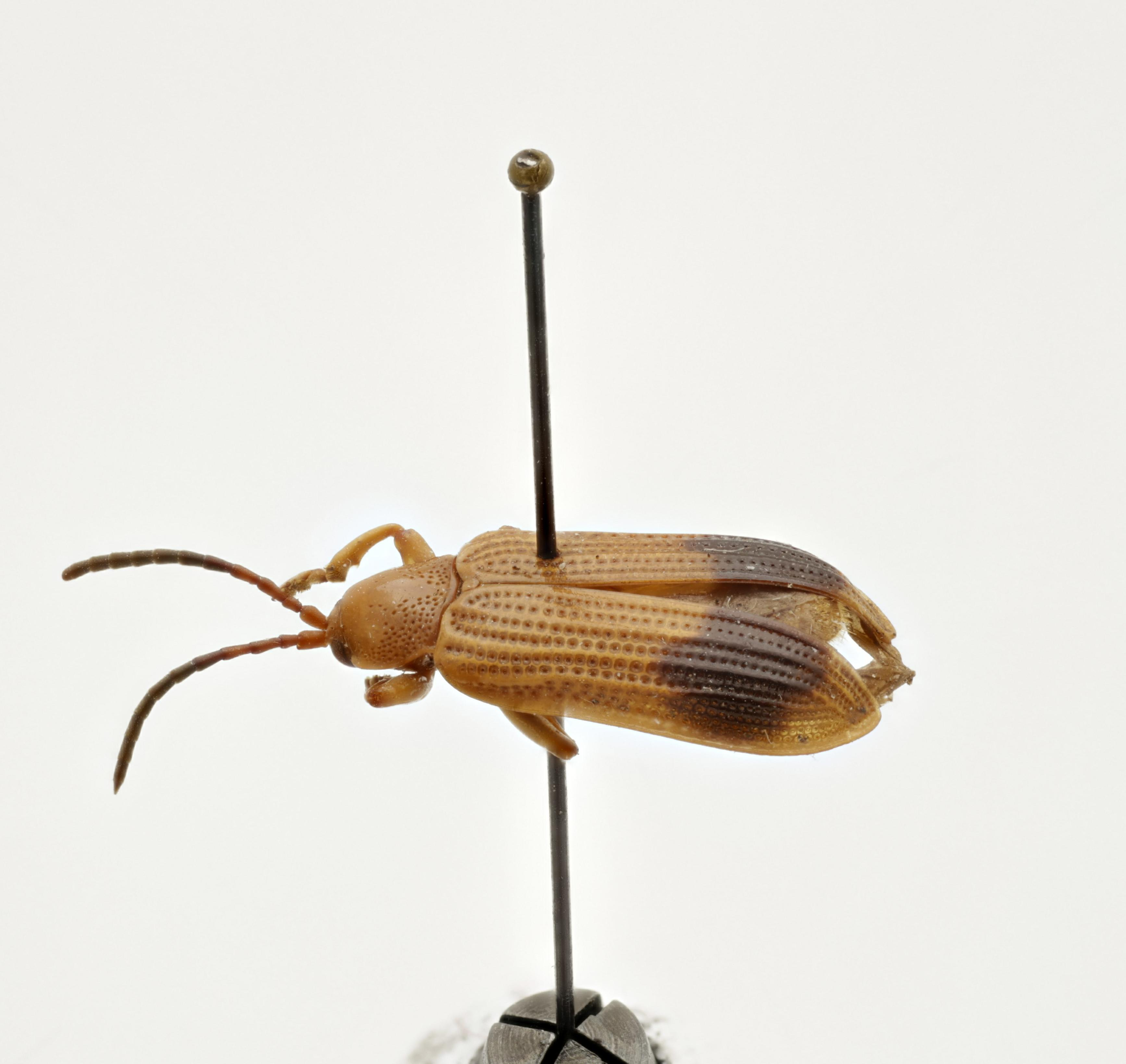
- Pistosia maculata

Scientific classification
- Kingdom: Animalia
- Phylum: Arthropoda
- Clade: Pancrustacea
- Class: Insecta
- Order: Coleoptera
- Suborder: Polyphaga
- Infraorder: Cucujiformia
- Family: Chrysomelidae
- Subfamily: Cassidinae
- Tribe: Bothryonopini
- Genus: Pistosia; Weise, 1905

= Pistosia =

Genus of leaf beetles

Pistosia is a genus of beetles belonging to the family Chrysomelidae.

== Species ==
- Pistosia maculata Weise, 1905
- Pistosia terminalis (Baly, 1869)
- Pistosia testacea (Fabricius, 1801)
