= Bothryonopa ingens =

Scientific classification
- Kingdom: Animalia
- Phylum: Arthropoda
- Clade: Pancrustacea
- Class: Insecta
- Order: Coleoptera
- Suborder: Polyphaga
- Infraorder: Cucujiformia
- Family: Chrysomelidae
- Genus: Bothryonopa
- Species: B. ingens

Binomial name
- Bothryonopa ingens Gestro, 1903

Synonyms
- Macrispa perakensis Maulik, 1929

Species of beetle

Bothryonopa ingens is a species of beetle in the family Chrysomelidae. It is found in Indonesia (Sumatra) and Malaysia.
