= Bothryonopa imperalis =

Scientific classification
- Kingdom: Animalia
- Phylum: Arthropoda
- Clade: Pancrustacea
- Class: Insecta
- Order: Coleoptera
- Suborder: Polyphaga
- Infraorder: Cucujiformia
- Family: Chrysomelidae
- Genus: Bothryonopa
- Species: B. imperalis

Binomial name
- Bothryonopa imperalis Baly, 1869

Synonyms
- Hispopria coeruleipennis Duvivier, 1885

Species of beetle

Bothryonopa imperalis is a species of beetle in the family Chrysomelidae. It is found in the Philippines (Mindanao).
