= Bothryonopa punctatissima =

Scientific classification
- Kingdom: Animalia
- Phylum: Arthropoda
- Clade: Pancrustacea
- Class: Insecta
- Order: Coleoptera
- Suborder: Polyphaga
- Infraorder: Cucujiformia
- Family: Chrysomelidae
- Genus: Bothryonopa
- Species: B. punctatissima

Binomial name
- Bothryonopa punctatissima (Chapuis, 1876)

Synonyms
- Hispopria punctatissima Chapuis, 1876

Species of beetle

Bothryonopa punctatissima is a species of beetle in the family Chrysomelidae. It is found in the Philippines (Luzon, Tayabas).
