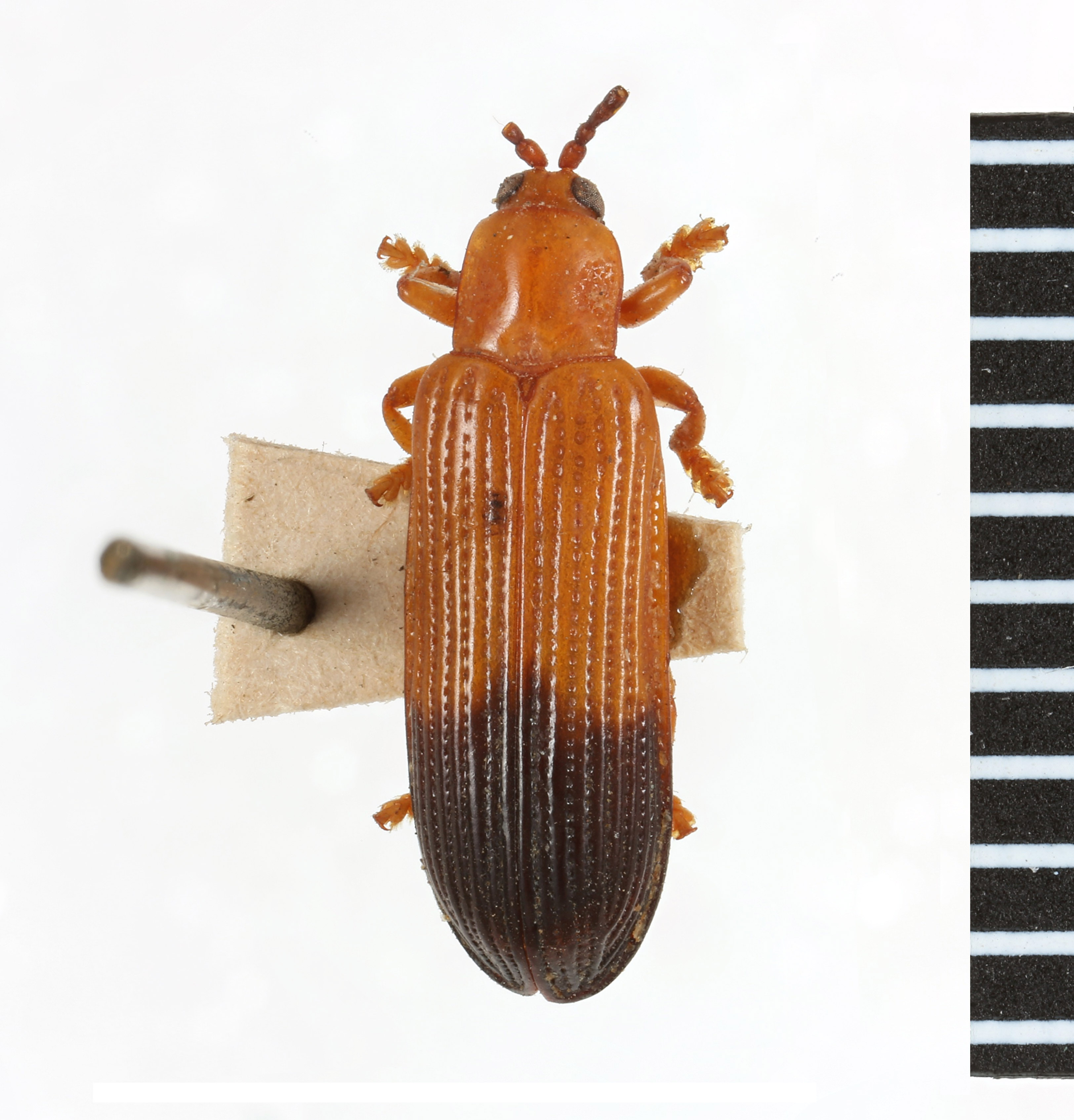

Scientific classification
- Kingdom: Animalia
- Phylum: Arthropoda
- Clade: Pancrustacea
- Class: Insecta
- Order: Coleoptera
- Suborder: Polyphaga
- Infraorder: Cucujiformia
- Family: Chrysomelidae
- Genus: Pistosia
- Species: P. terminalis

Binomial name
- Pistosia terminalis (Baly, 1869)

Synonyms
- Estigmena terminalis Baly, 1869

= Pistosia terminalis =

Species of beetle

Pistosia terminalis is a species of beetle in the family Chrysomelidae. It is found in Indonesia (Sulawesi).
