= Bothryonopini =

- Botryonopa sheppardi

Scientific classification
- Kingdom: Animalia
- Phylum: Arthropoda
- Class: Insecta
- Order: Coleoptera
- Suborder: Polyphaga
- Infraorder: Cucujiformia
- Family: Chrysomelidae
- Subfamily: Cassidinae
- Tribe: Bothryonopini; Chapuis, 1875

Synonyms
- Botryonopites Chapuis, 1875; Wallaceites Chapuis, 1875; Botryonopini Weise, 1911

Tribe of leaf beetles

Bothryonopini is a tribe of Asian leaf beetles within the subfamily Cassidinae; both the tribe and type genus are also known by the orthographic variants: Botryonopini and Botryonopa.

== Genera ==
1. Bothryonopa Guérin-Méneville, 1840
2. Macrispa Baly, 1858
3. Neodownesia Gressitt, 1953
4. Pistosia Weise, 1905
5. Wallacea Baly, 1859
