= Polychalca nickerli =

Scientific classification
- Kingdom: Animalia
- Phylum: Arthropoda
- Clade: Pancrustacea
- Class: Insecta
- Order: Coleoptera
- Suborder: Polyphaga
- Infraorder: Cucujiformia
- Family: Chrysomelidae
- Genus: Polychalca
- Species: P. nickerli

Binomial name
- Polychalca nickerli (Spaeth, 1907)

Synonyms
- Desmonota nickerli Spaeth, 1907

Species of beetle

Polychalca nickerli is a species of beetle of the family Chrysomelidae. It is found in Brazil (Pernambuco).
