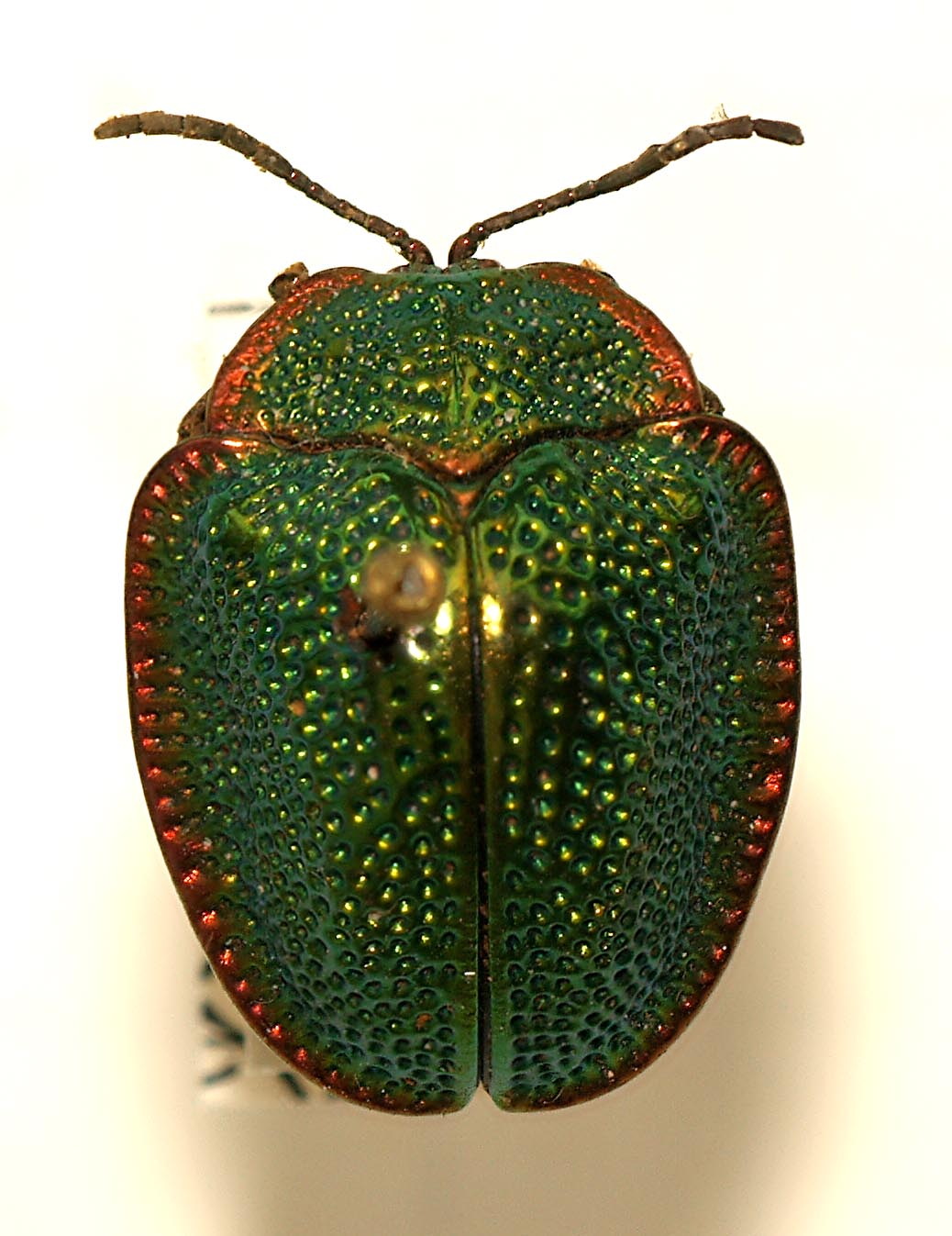
- Polychalca punctatissima

Scientific classification
- Kingdom: Animalia
- Phylum: Arthropoda
- Clade: Pancrustacea
- Class: Insecta
- Order: Coleoptera
- Suborder: Polyphaga
- Infraorder: Cucujiformia
- Family: Chrysomelidae
- Tribe: Omocerini
- Genus: Polychalca; Chevrolat, 1837

Synonyms
- Phalantha Gistl, 1848; Desmonota Hope, 1840; Pilidionota Spaeth, 1913; Muzonia Spaeth, 1913

= Polychalca =

Genus of beetles

Polychalca is a genus of South American tortoise beetles belonging to the family Chrysomelidae.

== Subgenera and species ==
Subgenus Desmonota Hope, 1839

- Polychalca aerea (Boheman, 1850)
- Polychalca duponti (Boheman, 1850)
- Polychalca gravida (Boheman, 1850)
- Polychalca platynota (Germar, 1824)
- Polychalca salebrosa (Boheman, 1850)

Subgenus Polychalca Chevrolat, 1837

- Polychalca cariosa (Boheman, 1850)
- Polychalca decora (Perty, 1830)
- Polychalca dentipennis (Boheman, 1850)
- Polychalca nickerli (Spaeth, 1907)
- Polychalca perforata (Boheman, 1850)
- Polychalca punctatissima (Wolf, 1818)
- Polychalca turpis (Boheman, 1850)
