= Polychalca aerea =

Scientific classification
- Kingdom: Animalia
- Phylum: Arthropoda
- Clade: Pancrustacea
- Class: Insecta
- Order: Coleoptera
- Suborder: Polyphaga
- Infraorder: Cucujiformia
- Family: Chrysomelidae
- Genus: Polychalca
- Species: P. aerea

Binomial name
- Polychalca aerea (Boheman, 1850)

Synonyms
- Desmonota aerea Boheman, 1850

Species of beetle

Polychalca aerea is a species of beetle of the family Chrysomelidae. It is found in Brazil (Bahia, Ceará, Minas Gerais, Paraíba, Pernambuco, Rio Grande do Norte).

== Life history ==
The recorded host plant is Cordia cylindrostachya.
