= Polychalca duponti =

Scientific classification
- Kingdom: Animalia
- Phylum: Arthropoda
- Clade: Pancrustacea
- Class: Insecta
- Order: Coleoptera
- Suborder: Polyphaga
- Infraorder: Cucujiformia
- Family: Chrysomelidae
- Genus: Polychalca
- Species: P. duponti

Binomial name
- Polychalca duponti (Boheman, 1850)

Synonyms
- Desmonota duponti Boheman, 1850

Species of beetle

Polychalca duponti is a species of beetle of the family Chrysomelidae. It is found in Brazil (Bahia, Pernambuco).
