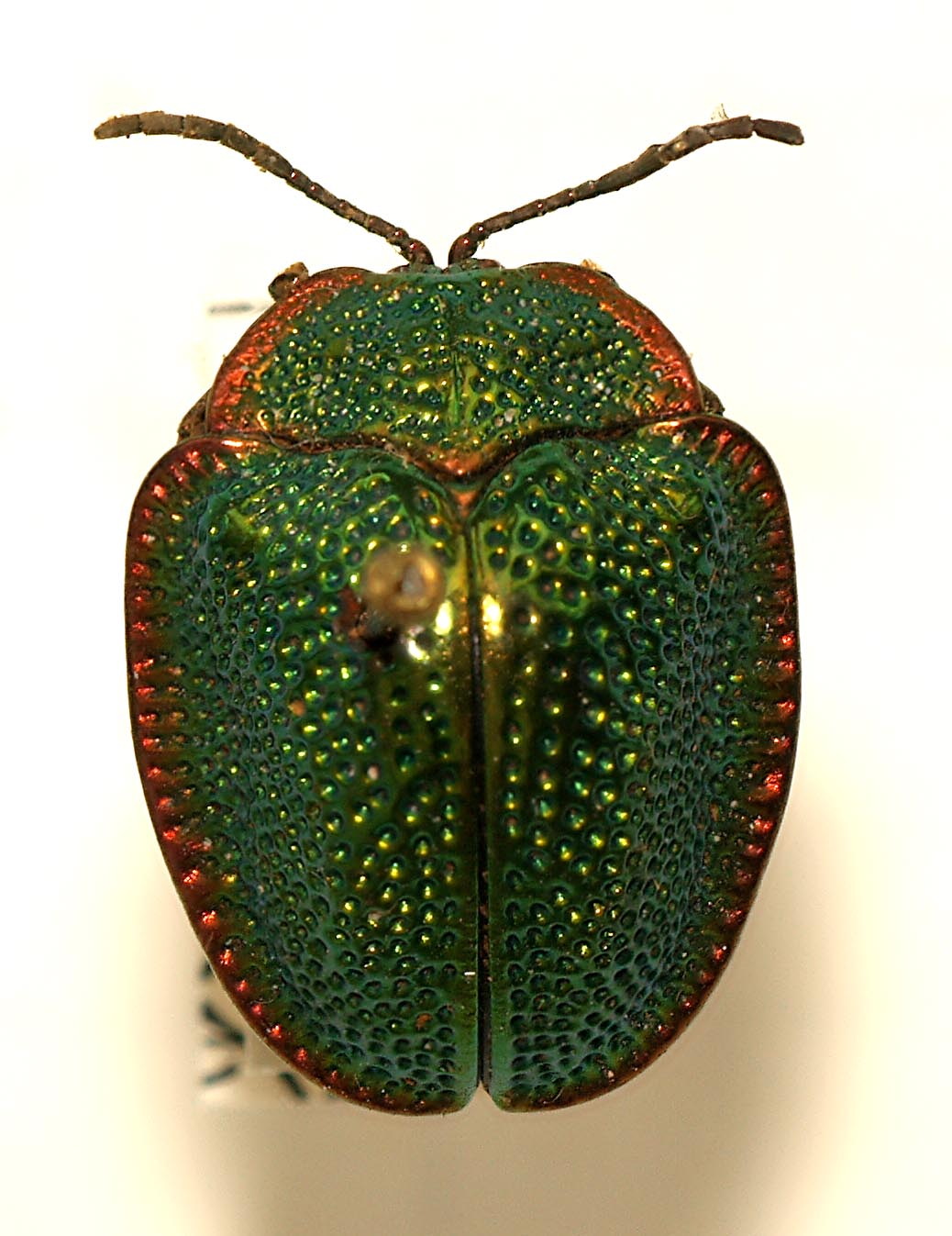
- Polychalca punctatissima

Scientific classification
- Kingdom: Animalia
- Phylum: Arthropoda
- Clade: Pancrustacea
- Class: Insecta
- Order: Coleoptera
- Suborder: Polyphaga
- Infraorder: Cucujiformia
- Family: Chrysomelidae
- Genus: Polychalca
- Species: P. punctatissima

Binomial name
- Polychalca punctatissima (Wolf, 1818)

Synonyms
- Cassida variolosa Weber, 1801 nec Olivier, 1790; Cassida punctatissima Wolf, 1818; Desmonota variolosa (Weber) Hope, 1840; Polychalca variolosa (Weber) Dejean, 1837; Cassida formosa Broun, 1880; Canistra formosa (Broun) Spaeth, 1914; Cassida smaragdina Vigors, 1826

= Polychalca punctatissima =

Species of beetle

Polychalca punctatissima is a species of tortoise beetles belonging to the family Chrysomelidae, that is noteworthy for its use in Victorian jewelry.

== Description ==
Polychalca punctatissima can reach a length of about 13–17 millimetres (0.51–0.67 in). These beetles feed on Black Sage (Cordia cylindrostachya, Boraginaceae).

== Distribution ==
This species can be found in Argentina, Bolivia, Brazil (Bahia, Goiás, Minas Gerais, Pernambuco) and Suriname.

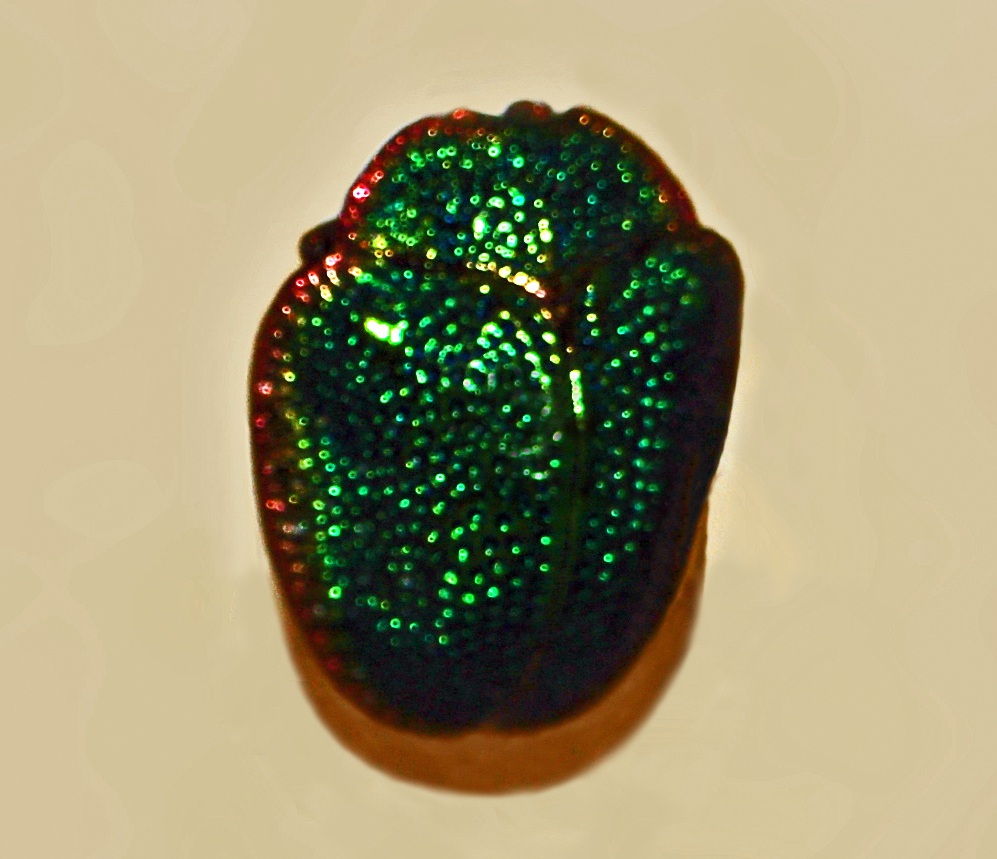
Polychalca punctatissima from Brazil. Mounted specimen

== Use in jewelry ==
The new wave of Victorian Egyptomania following the opening of the Suez Canal in 1869 increased the demand for Egyptian jewelry, especially scarabs. This, combined with an increased interest in the natural world, lead to the import of Polychalca punctatissima carapaces from South America for use in jewelry as "scarabs".
