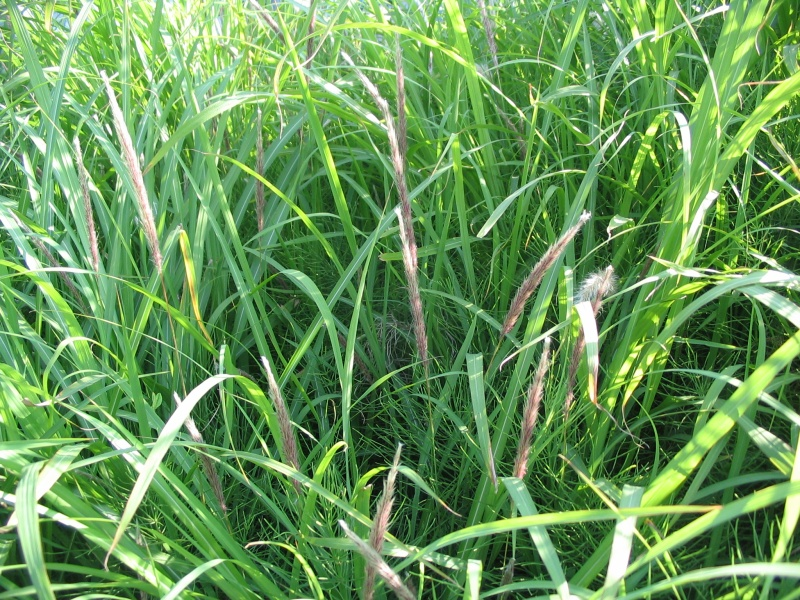
- Imperata cylindrica

Scientific classification
- Kingdom: Plantae
- Clade: Tracheophytes
- Clade: Angiosperms
- Clade: Monocots
- Clade: Commelinids
- Order: Poales
- Family: Poaceae
- Subfamily: Panicoideae
- Supertribe: Andropogonodae
- Tribe: Andropogoneae
- Subtribe: Saccharinae
- Genus: Imperata; Cirillo

Type species
- Imperata arundinacea Cirillo

= Imperata =

Satintails

Genus of grasses

Imperata is a small but widespread genus of tropical and subtropical grasses, commonly known as satintails.

Satintail grass species are perennial rhizomatous herbs with solid, erect stems and silky inflorescences. The best known species is Imperata cylindrica, which is recognized as a devastating noxious weed in many places and cultivated as an ornamental plant in others.

The genus is named after Ferrante Imperato, a Renaissance apothecary who lived in Naples in the late-16th and early-17th centuries. His collection included a herbarium.

== Species ==
As of November 2022, Plants of the World Online accepted the following species:

- Imperata brasiliensis - South + Central America, West Indies, southern Mexico
- Imperata brevifolia - southwestern US (CA AZ NV UT NM TX)
- Imperata cheesemanii - Kermadec Islands (part of New Zealand)
- Imperata condensata - Argentina, Chile
- Imperata conferta - plumegrass, kunay grass - Southeast Asia, Papuasia, Micronesia
- Imperata contracta - guayanilla - South + Central America, West Indies, southern Mexico
- Imperata cylindrica - bladygrass, cogongrass, speargrass, silver-spike - Africa, southern Europe, southwestern Asia; introduced in central and eastern Asia, North America, various islands
- Imperata flavida - Hainan Province in China
- Imperata minutiflora - Ecuador, Peru, Bolivia, Brazil, Argentina
- Imperata parodii - southern Chile
- Imperata tenuis - Bolivia, Peru, Ecuador, Brazil, Corrientes Province of Argentina

=== Formerly Included ===
Various species have been relocated to other genera, such as Cinna, Lagurus, Miscanthus Saccharum, and Tripidium:

- Imperata eulalioides - Miscanthus sacchariflorus
- Imperata exaltata - Tripidium arundinaceum
- Imperata klaga - Saccharum spontaneum
- Imperata ovata - Lagurus ovatus
- Imperata saccharifera - Cinna arundinacea
- Imperata sacchariflora - Miscanthus sacchariflorus
- Imperata sara - Tripidium bengalense (syn. Saccharum bengalense)
- Imperata spontanea - Saccharum spontaneum
- Imperata tinctoria - Miscanthus tinctorius
