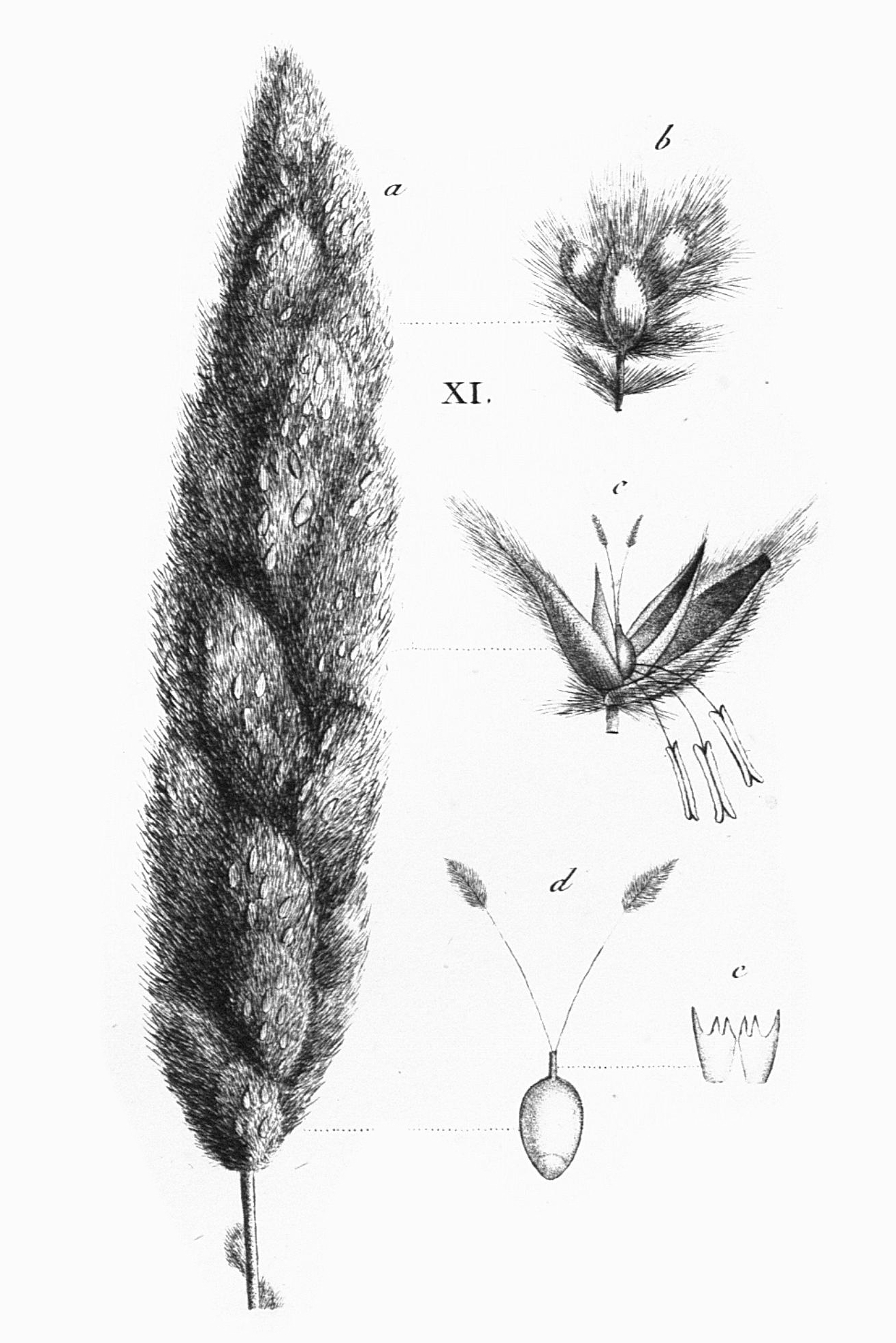
- Eriochrysis cayennensis

Scientific classification
- Kingdom: Plantae
- Clade: Tracheophytes
- Clade: Angiosperms
- Clade: Monocots
- Clade: Commelinids
- Order: Poales
- Family: Poaceae
- Subfamily: Panicoideae
- Supertribe: Andropogonodae
- Tribe: Andropogoneae
- Subtribe: Saccharinae
- Genus: Eriochrysis; P.Beauv.

Type species
- Eriochrysis cayennensis P.Beauv.

Synonyms
- Leptosaccharum (Hack.) A.Camus

= Eriochrysis =

Genus of grasses

Eriochrysis is a genus of African and Neotropical plants in the grass family.

Species

- Eriochrysis brachypogon (Stapf) Stapf - tropical + southern Africa - from Senegal to Eswatini
- Eriochrysis cayennensis P.Beauv. - tropical Americas from Chiapas to Uruguay
- Eriochrysis × concepcionensis Killeen - Bolivia, Brazil (E. cayennensis × E. laxa)
- Eriochrysis filiformis (Hack.) Filg. - Brazil, Paraguay
- Eriochrysis holcoides (Nees) Kuhlm. - Venezuela, Colombia, Brazil, Bolivia, Paraguay
- Eriochrysis laxa Swallen - Brazil, Bolivia, Argentina
- Eriochrysis pallida Munro - tropical + southern Africa - from Guinea to KwaZulu-Natal
- Eriochrysis purpurata (Rendle) Stapf - tropical Africa from Congo Rep to Zimbabwe
- Eriochrysis rangacharii C.E.C.Fisch. - Tamil Nadu
- Eriochrysis villosa Swallen - Brazil (Paraná, Santa Catarina, Rio Grande do Sul)
- Eriochrysis warmingiana (Hack.) Kuhlm. - Brazil, Paraguay, Bolivia

formerly included

see Miscanthus Saccharum

- Eriochrysis attenuata - Miscanthus fuscus
- Eriochrysis fusca - Miscanthus fuscus
- Eriochrysis giordaniana - Saccharum narenga
- Eriochrysis longifolia - Saccharum fallax
- Eriochrysis narenga - Saccharum narenga
- Eriochrysis porphyrocoma - Saccharum narenga
