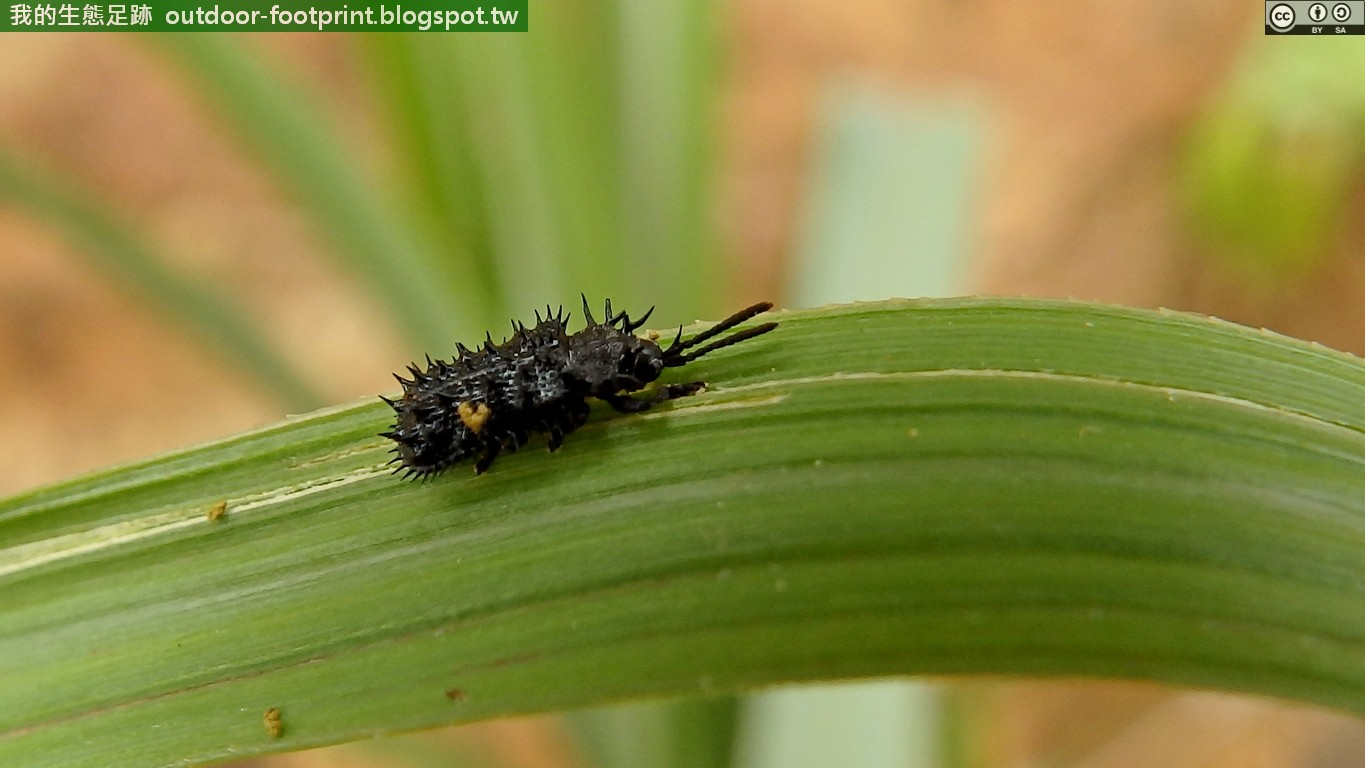

Scientific classification
- Kingdom: Animalia
- Phylum: Arthropoda
- Clade: Pancrustacea
- Class: Insecta
- Order: Coleoptera
- Suborder: Polyphaga
- Infraorder: Cucujiformia
- Family: Chrysomelidae
- Genus: Hispellinus
- Species: H. callicanthus

Binomial name
- Hispellinus callicanthus (Bates, 1866)

Synonyms
- Hispa perotetii Motschulsky 1861 (preocc.); Hispa callicanthus Bates, 1866; Monochirus moestus Baly, 1888; Monochirus formosanus Uhmann, 1927

= Hispellinus callicanthus =

Species of beetle

Hispellinus callicanthus is a species of beetle of the family Chrysomelidae. It is found in China (Anhui, Fujian, Hainan, Guangxi, Guangdong, Guizhou, Yunnan), India (West Bengal), Indonesia (Borneo, Sulawesi, Java, Nias, Sumatra), Laos, Malaysia, Myanmar, the Philippines (Luzon, Mindanao, Negros, Panay), Sri Lanka, Taiwan, Thailand and Vietnam.

== Life history ==
The recorded host plants for this species are Bambusa blumeana, Saccharum species (including Saccharum officinarum and Saccharum sinense), Oryza sativa, Zizania caduciflora, Centotheca species, Imperata cylindrica and Miscanthus species (including Miscanthus floridulus).
