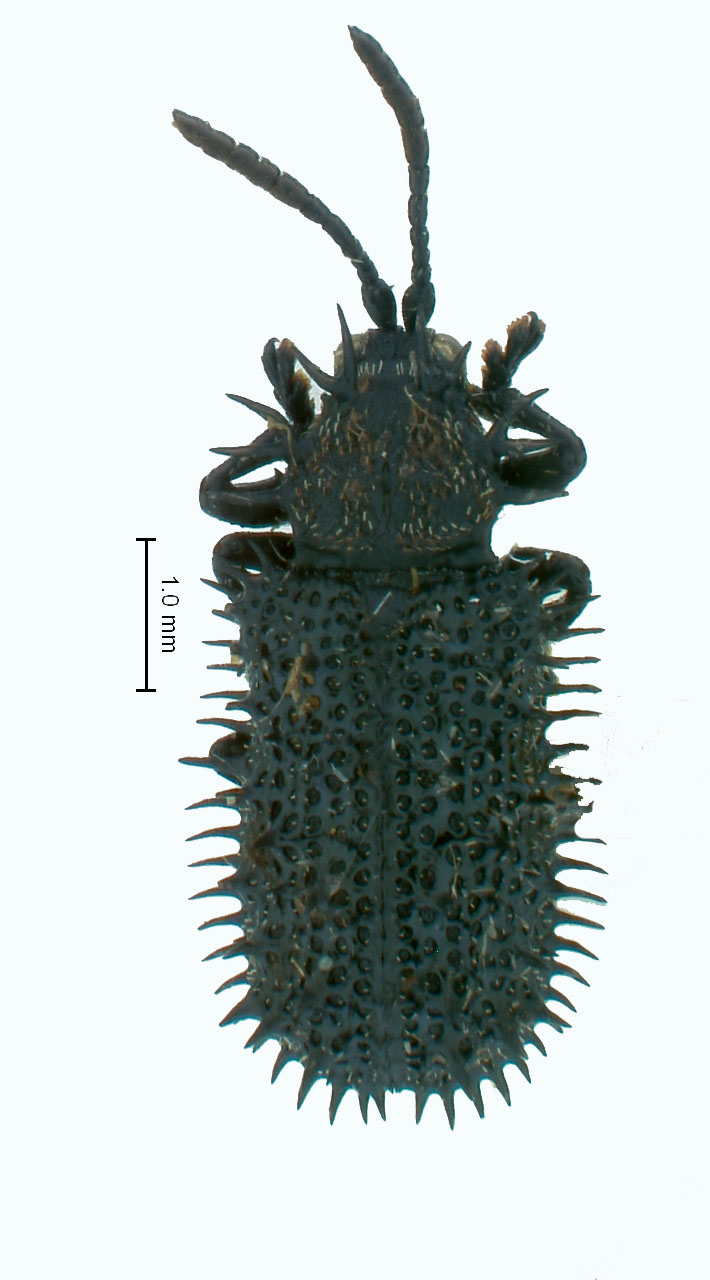

Scientific classification
- Kingdom: Animalia
- Phylum: Arthropoda
- Class: Insecta
- Order: Coleoptera
- Suborder: Polyphaga
- Infraorder: Cucujiformia
- Family: Chrysomelidae
- Genus: Hispellinus
- Species: H. csikii

Binomial name
- Hispellinus csikii (Gestro, 1907)

Synonyms
- Monochirus csikii Gestro, 1907

= Hispellinus csikii =

Species of beetle

Hispellinus csikii is a species of beetle of the family Chrysomelidae. It is found in New Guinea.

== Life history ==
The recorded host plants for this species are Saccharum spontaneum, Themeda and Imperata species.
