= Elachista saccharella =

Scientific classification
- Domain: Eukaryota
- Kingdom: Animalia
- Phylum: Arthropoda
- Class: Insecta
- Order: Lepidoptera
- Family: Elachistidae
- Genus: Elachista
- Species: E. saccharella

Binomial name
- Elachista saccharella (Busck, 1933)

Synonyms
- Donacivola saccharella Busck, 1933

Species of moth

Elachista saccharella, the sugarcane leafminer moth, is a moth of the family Elachistidae. It is found in Florida, and Louisiana in the United States and in Cuba.

The larvae feed on Saccharum species. They mine the leaves of their host plant.
