= Hispellinus albertisii =

Scientific classification
- Kingdom: Animalia
- Phylum: Arthropoda
- Class: Insecta
- Order: Coleoptera
- Suborder: Polyphaga
- Infraorder: Cucujiformia
- Family: Chrysomelidae
- Genus: Hispellinus
- Species: H. albertisii

Binomial name
- Hispellinus albertisii (Gestro, 1897)

Synonyms
- Monochirus albertisii Gestro, 1897

Species of beetle

Hispellinus albertisii is a species of beetle of the family Chrysomelidae. It is found in New Guinea.

== Life history ==
The recorded host plants for this species are grasses, including Saccharum species and Zea mays.
