= Hispellinus moerens =

Scientific classification
- Kingdom: Animalia
- Phylum: Arthropoda
- Class: Insecta
- Order: Coleoptera
- Suborder: Polyphaga
- Infraorder: Cucujiformia
- Family: Chrysomelidae
- Genus: Hispellinus
- Species: H. moerens

Binomial name
- Hispellinus moerens (Baly, 1874)

Synonyms
- Hispa moerens Baly, 1874

Species of beetle

Hispellinus moerens is a species of beetle of the family Chrysomelidae. It is found in China (Zhejiang, Jiangsu), Korea, Japan, Russia (Siberia) and Taiwan.

== Life history ==
The recorded host plants for this species are Miscanthus and Hemarthria species.
