= Leptispa graminum =

Scientific classification
- Kingdom: Animalia
- Phylum: Arthropoda
- Clade: Pancrustacea
- Class: Insecta
- Order: Coleoptera
- Suborder: Polyphaga
- Infraorder: Cucujiformia
- Family: Chrysomelidae
- Genus: Leptispa
- Species: L. graminum

Binomial name
- Leptispa graminum Gestro, 1906

Species of beetle

Leptispa graminum is a species of beetle of the family Chrysomelidae. It is found in Congo, Equatorial Guinea, Guiana, Ivory Coast, Nigeria, Senegal and Uganda.

== Life history ==
The recorded host plants for this species are Saccharum species, Oryza sativa and Rottboellia exaltata.
