= Hispellinus multispinosus =

Scientific classification
- Kingdom: Animalia
- Phylum: Arthropoda
- Class: Insecta
- Order: Coleoptera
- Suborder: Polyphaga
- Infraorder: Cucujiformia
- Family: Chrysomelidae
- Genus: Hispellinus
- Species: H. multispinosus

Binomial name
- Hispellinus multispinosus (Germar, 1848)

Synonyms
- Hispa multispinosus Germar, 1848

Species of beetle

Hispellinus multispinosus is a species of beetle of the family Chrysomelidae. It is found in Australia (New South Wales, Queensland), Myanmar and New Guinea.

== Life history ==
The recorded host plants for this species are grasses, including Saccharum officinarum, Saccharum spontaneum, Imperata and Themeda species.
