= Leptispa rufithorax =

Scientific classification
- Kingdom: Animalia
- Phylum: Arthropoda
- Class: Insecta
- Order: Coleoptera
- Suborder: Polyphaga
- Infraorder: Cucujiformia
- Family: Chrysomelidae
- Genus: Leptispa
- Species: L. rufithorax

Binomial name
- Leptispa rufithorax Maulik, 1919

Species of beetle

Leptispa rufithorax is a species of beetle of the family Chrysomelidae. It is found in India (Madras, Tamil Nadu).

== Life history ==
The recorded host plants for this species are Saccharum species.
