= Leptispa arundina =

Scientific classification
- Kingdom: Animalia
- Phylum: Arthropoda
- Class: Insecta
- Order: Coleoptera
- Suborder: Polyphaga
- Infraorder: Cucujiformia
- Family: Chrysomelidae
- Genus: Leptispa
- Species: L. arundina

Binomial name
- Leptispa arundina Maulik, 1937

Species of beetle

Leptispa arundina is a species of beetle of the family Chrysomelidae. It is found in India.

== Life history ==
The recorded host plant for this species is Saccharum arundinaceum.
