= Leptispa taguchii =

Scientific classification
- Kingdom: Animalia
- Phylum: Arthropoda
- Class: Insecta
- Order: Coleoptera
- Suborder: Polyphaga
- Infraorder: Cucujiformia
- Family: Chrysomelidae
- Genus: Leptispa
- Species: L. taguchii

Binomial name
- Leptispa taguchii Chûjô, 1956

Species of beetle

Leptispa taguchii is a species of beetle of the family Chrysomelidae. It is found in Japan.

== Life history ==
The recorded host plants for this species are Miscanthus species.
