= Hispellinus germari =

Scientific classification
- Kingdom: Animalia
- Phylum: Arthropoda
- Class: Insecta
- Order: Coleoptera
- Suborder: Polyphaga
- Infraorder: Cucujiformia
- Family: Chrysomelidae
- Genus: Hispellinus
- Species: H. germari

Binomial name
- Hispellinus germari (Chapuis, 1877)

Synonyms
- Monochirus germari Chapuis, 1877

Species of beetle

Hispellinus germari is a species of beetle of the family Chrysomelidae. It is found in Australia (New South Wales, Queensland, West Australia) and New Guinea.

== Life history ==
The recorded host plants for this species are grasses (Poaceae).
