= Leptispa bambusae =

Scientific classification
- Kingdom: Animalia
- Phylum: Arthropoda
- Class: Insecta
- Order: Coleoptera
- Suborder: Polyphaga
- Infraorder: Cucujiformia
- Family: Chrysomelidae
- Genus: Leptispa
- Species: L. bambusae

Binomial name
- Leptispa bambusae Voronova and Zajtsev, 1982

Species of beetle

Leptispa bambusae is a species of beetle of the family Chrysomelidae. It is found in Vietnam.

== Life history ==
The recorded host plants for this species are bamboo species (Poaceae).
