= Leptispa =

Scientific classification
- Kingdom: Animalia
- Phylum: Arthropoda
- Class: Insecta
- Order: Coleoptera
- Suborder: Polyphaga
- Infraorder: Cucujiformia
- Family: Chrysomelidae
- Subfamily: Cassidinae
- Tribe: Leptispini
- Genus: Leptispa; Baly, 1858

Synonyms
- Leptomorpha Germar, 1842; Parallelispa Fairmaire, 1884; Leptispa (Paradownesia) Gestro, 1899; Lepthispa Weise, 1911

Genus of leaf beetles

Leptispa is a genus of beetles belonging to the family Chrysomelidae.

== Species ==
- Leptispa abdominalis Baly, 1858
- Leptispa allardi Baly, 1890
- Leptispa anceyi (Pic, 1924)
- Leptispa angolensis Pic, 1936
- Leptispa angulata Uhmann, 1954
- Leptispa angustata Pic, 1925
- Leptispa angustior Pic, 1951
- Leptispa anu Basu, 1999
- Leptispa arundina Maulik, 1937
- Leptispa atra Gestro, 1917
- Leptispa bambusae Voronova and Zajtsev, 1982
- Leptispa bengalensis Takizawa, 1989
- Leptispa bicolor Pic, 1929
- Leptispa bicornis Spaeth, 1933
- Leptispa bifoveolata Pic, 1951
- Leptispa bouchardi (Gestro, 1906)
- Leptispa clavareuai Weise, 1902
- Leptispa collaris Chen and Yu, 1961
- Leptispa collarti Uhmann, 1936
- Leptispa cornuta Uhmann, 1936
- Leptispa denticulata Achard, 1919
- Leptispa distincta (Gestro, 1908)
- Leptispa donckieri Pic, 1925
- Leptispa filiformis (Germar, 1842)
- Leptispa frontalis Weise, 1903
- Leptispa godwini Baly, 1869
- Leptispa gracilis Péringuey, 1898
- Leptispa graminum Gestro, 1906
- Leptispa grandis Pic, 1937
- Leptispa hova (Gestro, 1908)
- Leptispa impressa Uhmann, 1939
- Leptispa impressicollis Pic, 1939
- Leptispa impressithorax Pic, 1953
- Leptispa inculta Gestro, 1908
- Leptispa intermedia Uhmann, 1949
- Leptispa irregularis Pic, 1951
- Leptispa kanistha Basu, 1999
- Leptispa krishna Basu, 1999
- Leptispa latifrons Weise, 1904
- Leptispa latior Pic, 1925
- Leptispa longipennis (Gestro, 1890)
- Leptispa longissima Pic, 1924
- Leptispa madagassa Weise, 1909
- Leptispa magna Chen and Yu, 1961
- Leptispa malaisei Uhmann, 1939
- Leptispa medvedevi Voronova & Zaitsev, 1982
- Leptispa miwai Chûjô, 1933
- Leptispa miyamotoi Kimoto, 1957
- Leptispa natalensis Baly, 1858
- Leptispa nigra Weise, 1904
- Leptispa notaticollis Pic, 1925
- Leptispa parallela (Gestro, 1899)
- Leptispa perforata Pic, 1925
- Leptispa perroti (Gestro, 1908)
- Leptispa pici Uhmann, 1958
- Leptispa piriformis Uhmann, 1960
- Leptispa punctata Uhmann, 1954
- Leptispa pygmaea Baly, 1858
- Leptispa quadraticollis (Fairmaire, 1884)
- Leptispa ruandana Uhmann, 1942
- Leptispa rufithorax Maulik, 1919
- Leptispa rugifrons Uhmann, 1938
- Leptispa samkirna Maulik, 1919
- Leptispa sebakuena Péringuey, 1908
- Leptispa sobrina Péringuey, 1908
- Leptispa spiculata Demaux, 1973
- Leptispa stigmata Uhmann, 1964
- Leptispa subangustata Pic, 1953
- Leptispa taguchii Chûjô, 1956
- Leptispa tonkinea Pic, 1929
- Leptispa viridis Gressitt, 1950

== Selected former species ==
- Leptispa bicoloripennis Voronova and Zajtzev, 1982
