= Leptispa miwai =

Scientific classification
- Kingdom: Animalia
- Phylum: Arthropoda
- Class: Insecta
- Order: Coleoptera
- Suborder: Polyphaga
- Infraorder: Cucujiformia
- Family: Chrysomelidae
- Genus: Leptispa
- Species: L. miwai

Binomial name
- Leptispa miwai Chûjô, 1933

Synonyms
- Leptispa bicolor Chûjô, 1933; Leptispa formosana Chûjô, 1934

Species of beetle

Leptispa miwai is a species of beetle of the family Chrysomelidae. It is found in Taiwan.

== Description ==
Adults reach a length of about 5.9-6.5 mm. They are shining black with a blackish-brown abdomen.

== Life history ==
The recorded host plant for this species is Miscanthus floridulus.
