= Leptispa frontalis =

Scientific classification
- Kingdom: Animalia
- Phylum: Arthropoda
- Class: Insecta
- Order: Coleoptera
- Suborder: Polyphaga
- Infraorder: Cucujiformia
- Family: Chrysomelidae
- Genus: Leptispa
- Species: L. frontalis

Binomial name
- Leptispa frontalis Weise, 1903

Species of beetle

Leptispa frontalis is a species of beetle of the family Chrysomelidae. It is found in the Democratic Republic of the Congo and Zimbabwe.

== Life history ==
No host plant has been documented for this species.
