= Leptispa denticulata =

Scientific classification
- Kingdom: Animalia
- Phylum: Arthropoda
- Class: Insecta
- Order: Coleoptera
- Suborder: Polyphaga
- Infraorder: Cucujiformia
- Family: Chrysomelidae
- Genus: Leptispa
- Species: L. denticulata

Binomial name
- Leptispa denticulata Achard, 1919

Synonyms
- Lepthispa similis Uhmann, 1931

Species of beetle

Leptispa denticulata is a species of beetle of the family Chrysomelidae. It is found in Angola, Cameroon, Congo and Tanzania.

== Life history ==
The recorded host plants for this species are grasses (Poaceae).
