= Leptispa bicornis =

Scientific classification
- Kingdom: Animalia
- Phylum: Arthropoda
- Clade: Pancrustacea
- Class: Insecta
- Order: Coleoptera
- Suborder: Polyphaga
- Infraorder: Cucujiformia
- Family: Chrysomelidae
- Genus: Leptispa
- Species: L. bicornis

Binomial name
- Leptispa bicornis Spaeth, 1933

Species of beetle

Leptispa bicornis is a species of beetle of the family Chrysomelidae. It is found in Indonesia (Java).

== Life history ==
The recorded host plants for this species are Bambusa species.
