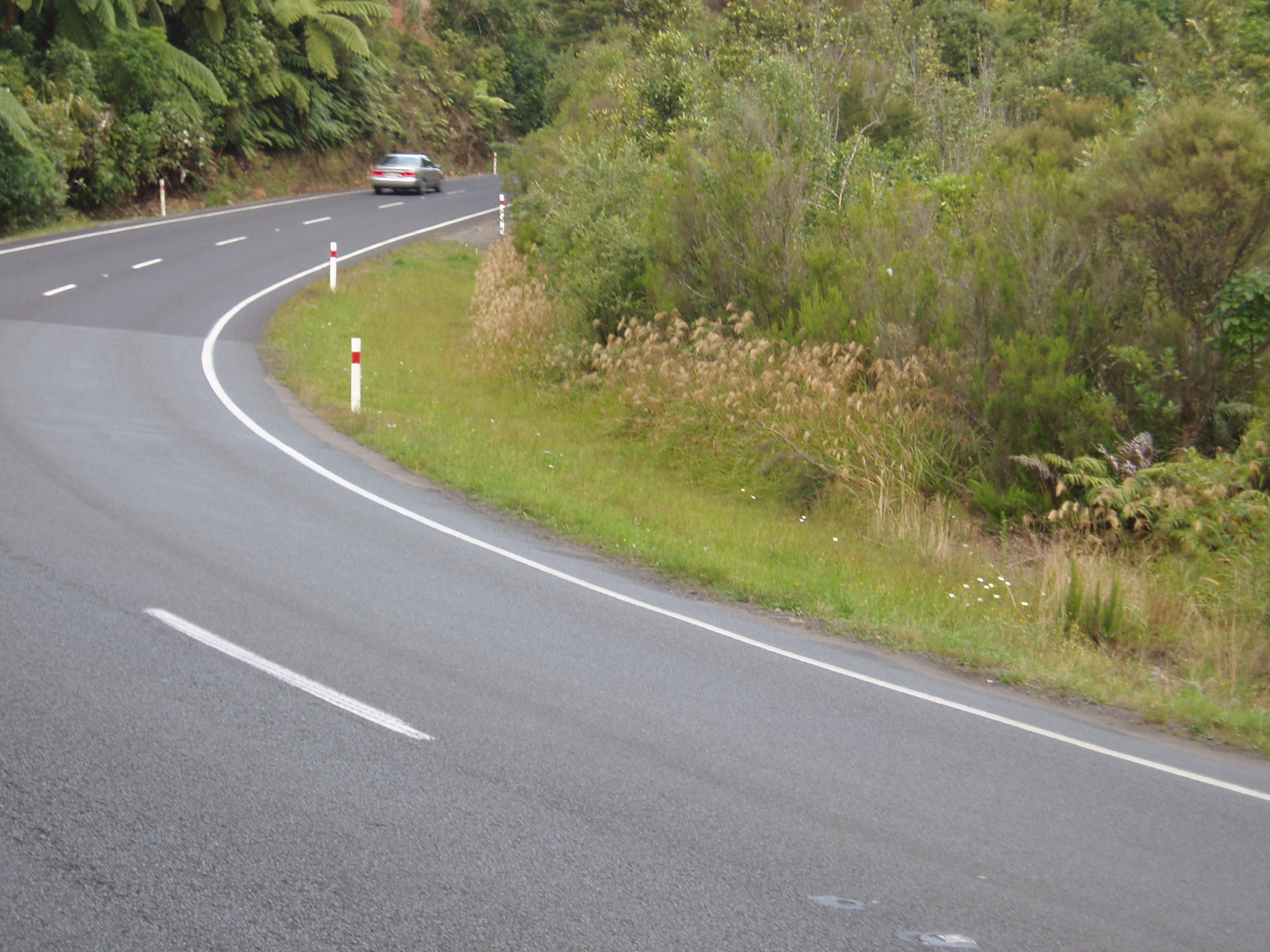

Scientific classification
- Kingdom: Plantae
- Clade: Tracheophytes
- Clade: Angiosperms
- Clade: Monocots
- Clade: Commelinids
- Order: Poales
- Family: Poaceae
- Subfamily: Panicoideae
- Genus: Miscanthus
- Species: M. nepalensis

Binomial name
- Miscanthus nepalensis (Trin.) Hack.

= Miscanthus nepalensis =

Species of plant

Miscanthus nepalensis, Himalayan fairy grass, is a species of flowering plant in the grass family Poaceae, native to mountain slopes in China (Sichuan, Xizang, Yunnan), Bhutan, India, Myanmar and Nepal, and introduced in Malaysia. It is found at elevations of 1,900–2,800 m (6,200–9,200 ft).

This decorative, deciduous grass grows 1 m (3.3 ft) tall, with arching green blades, often turning bronze in winter. Terminal clusters of yellow spikelets appear in summer, forming seed-heads in autumn.

It is grown as an ornamental for temperate gardens, where it requires a sunny position.
