= Leptispa clavareuai =

Scientific classification
- Kingdom: Animalia
- Phylum: Arthropoda
- Class: Insecta
- Order: Coleoptera
- Suborder: Polyphaga
- Infraorder: Cucujiformia
- Family: Chrysomelidae
- Genus: Leptispa
- Species: L. clavareuai

Binomial name
- Leptispa clavareuai (Weise, 1902)

Synonyms
- Lepthispa ruficollis Uhmann, 1931

Species of beetle

Leptispa clavareuai is a species of beetle of the family Chrysomelidae. It is found in Angola, Congo, Rwanda, Tanzania and Uganda.

== Life history ==
The recorded host plants for this species are Marantochloa species.
