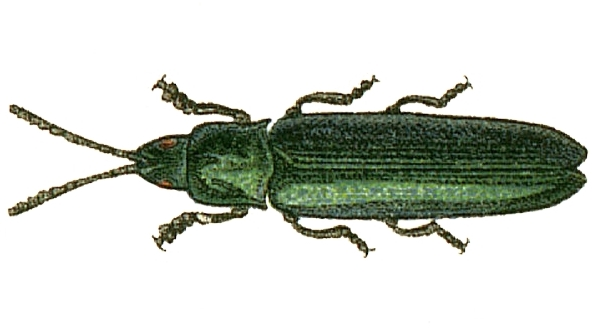

Scientific classification
- Kingdom: Animalia
- Phylum: Arthropoda
- Class: Insecta
- Order: Coleoptera
- Suborder: Polyphaga
- Infraorder: Cucujiformia
- Family: Chrysomelidae
- Genus: Leptispa
- Species: L. filiformis

Binomial name
- Leptispa filiformis (Germar, 1842)

Synonyms
- Leptomorpha filiformis Germar, 1842

= Leptispa filiformis =

Species of beetle

Leptispa filiformis is a species of beetle of the family Chrysomelidae. It is found in southern Europe France (Corsica), Greece (Crete), Italy (mainland, Sardinia and Sicily), Portugal, Spain, Turkey, northern Africa (Algeria, Morocco, Tunisia) and the Near East (Palestine, Israel).

== Life history ==
The recorded host plants for this species are Dactylis glomerata, Phragmites australis and Scirpus species.
