= Hispellinus sthulacundus =

Scientific classification
- Kingdom: Animalia
- Phylum: Arthropoda
- Class: Insecta
- Order: Coleoptera
- Suborder: Polyphaga
- Infraorder: Cucujiformia
- Family: Chrysomelidae
- Genus: Hispellinus
- Species: H. sthulacundus

Binomial name
- Hispellinus sthulacundus (Maulik, 1915)

Synonyms
- Monochirus sthulacundus Maulik, 1915

Species of beetle

Hispellinus sthulacundus is a species of beetle of the family Chrysomelidae. It is found in Bangladesh and India (West Bengal).

== Life history ==
No host plant has been documented for this species.
