= Leptispa pici =

Scientific classification
- Kingdom: Animalia
- Phylum: Arthropoda
- Class: Insecta
- Order: Coleoptera
- Suborder: Polyphaga
- Infraorder: Cucujiformia
- Family: Chrysomelidae
- Genus: Leptispa
- Species: L. pici

Binomial name
- Leptispa pici Uhmann, 1958

Synonyms
- Leptispa perroti Pic, 1939 (not Gestro); Leptispa bicoloripennis Voronova & Zaitsev, 1982

Species of beetle

Leptispa pici is a species of beetle of the family Chrysomelidae. It is found in China (Guangxi), Laos and Vietnam.

== Life history ==
The recorded host plants for this species are bamboo species (Poaceae).
