= Leptispa allardi =

Scientific classification
- Kingdom: Animalia
- Phylum: Arthropoda
- Class: Insecta
- Order: Coleoptera
- Suborder: Polyphaga
- Infraorder: Cucujiformia
- Family: Chrysomelidae
- Genus: Leptispa
- Species: L. allardi

Binomial name
- Leptispa allardi Baly, 1890

Synonyms
- Downesia (Paradownesia) oberthuri Gestro, 1899

Species of beetle

Leptispa allardi is a species of beetle of the family Chrysomelidae. It is found in China (Yunnan) and Vietnam.

== Life history ==
The recorded host plants for this species are Bambusa species and Phragmites communis.
