= Leptispa sebakuena =

Scientific classification
- Kingdom: Animalia
- Phylum: Arthropoda
- Clade: Pancrustacea
- Class: Insecta
- Order: Coleoptera
- Suborder: Polyphaga
- Infraorder: Cucujiformia
- Family: Chrysomelidae
- Genus: Leptispa
- Species: L. sebakuena

Binomial name
- Leptispa sebakuena Péringuey, 1908

Species of beetle

Leptispa sebakuena is a species of beetle of the family Chrysomelidae. It is found in Zimbabwe.

== Description ==
Its body is black and somewhat shiny, with cyaneous-black elytra. It has short antennae, with short pubescence on the last three joints.

== Life history ==
No host plant has been documented for this species.
