= Leptispa hova =

Scientific classification
- Kingdom: Animalia
- Phylum: Arthropoda
- Class: Insecta
- Order: Coleoptera
- Suborder: Polyphaga
- Infraorder: Cucujiformia
- Family: Chrysomelidae
- Genus: Leptispa
- Species: L. hova

Binomial name
- Leptispa hova (Gestro, 1908)

Synonyms
- Paradownesia hova Gestro, 1908

Species of beetle

Leptispa hova is a species of beetle of the family Chrysomelidae. It is found in Madagascar.

== Life history ==
No host plant has been documented for this species.
