= Leptispa godwini =

Scientific classification
- Kingdom: Animalia
- Phylum: Arthropoda
- Class: Insecta
- Order: Coleoptera
- Suborder: Polyphaga
- Infraorder: Cucujiformia
- Family: Chrysomelidae
- Genus: Leptispa
- Species: L. godwini

Binomial name
- Leptispa godwini Baly, 1869

Synonyms
- Paradownesia fruhstroferi Gestro, 1906

Species of beetle

Leptispa godwini is a species of beetle of the family Chrysomelidae. It is found in China (Zhejiang, Fujian, Hubei, Jiangxi, Jiangsu), Japan and Vietnam.

== Life history ==
The recorded host plants for this species are Phyllostachys glauca, Phyllostachys pubescens, Pleioblastus amarus, Sinocalamus and Dendrocalamus species.
