= Hispellinus minor =

Scientific classification
- Kingdom: Animalia
- Phylum: Arthropoda
- Clade: Pancrustacea
- Class: Insecta
- Order: Coleoptera
- Suborder: Polyphaga
- Infraorder: Cucujiformia
- Family: Chrysomelidae
- Genus: Hispellinus
- Species: H. minor

Binomial name
- Hispellinus minor (Maulik, 1919)

Synonyms
- Monochirus minor Maulik, 1919

Species of beetle

Hispellinus minor, is a species of leaf beetle native to India (Arunachal Pradesh), Sri Lanka and Sumatra.

== Life history ==
No host plant has been documented for this species.
