= Hispellinus tuberiger =

Scientific classification
- Kingdom: Animalia
- Phylum: Arthropoda
- Class: Insecta
- Order: Coleoptera
- Suborder: Polyphaga
- Infraorder: Cucujiformia
- Family: Chrysomelidae
- Genus: Hispellinus
- Species: H. tuberiger

Binomial name
- Hispellinus tuberiger Uhmann, 1940

Species of beetle

Hispellinus tuberiger is a species of beetle of the family Chrysomelidae. It is found in Kenya and Congo.

== Life history ==
No host plant has been documented for this species.
