= Leptispa miyamotoi =

Scientific classification
- Kingdom: Animalia
- Phylum: Arthropoda
- Class: Insecta
- Order: Coleoptera
- Suborder: Polyphaga
- Infraorder: Cucujiformia
- Family: Chrysomelidae
- Genus: Leptispa
- Species: L. miyamotoi

Binomial name
- Leptispa miyamotoi Kimoto, 1957

Species of beetle

Leptispa miyamotoi is a species of beetle of the family Chrysomelidae. It is found in the Ryukyu Islands in Japan.

== Life history ==
The recorded host plant for this species is Saccharum officinarum.
