= Leptispa longipennis =

Scientific classification
- Kingdom: Animalia
- Phylum: Arthropoda
- Class: Insecta
- Order: Coleoptera
- Suborder: Polyphaga
- Infraorder: Cucujiformia
- Family: Chrysomelidae
- Genus: Leptispa
- Species: L. longipennis

Binomial name
- Leptispa longipennis (Gestro, 1890)

Synonyms
- Downesia longipennis Gestro, 1890

Species of beetle

Leptispa longipennis is a species of beetle of the family Chrysomelidae. It is found in Bhutan, China (Guangdong), Myanmar and Vietnam.

== Life history ==
The recorded host plants for this species are Sinocalamus beecheyanus, Bambusa species (including Bambusa pervariablis), Phyllostachys species and Dendrocalamopsis oldhami.
