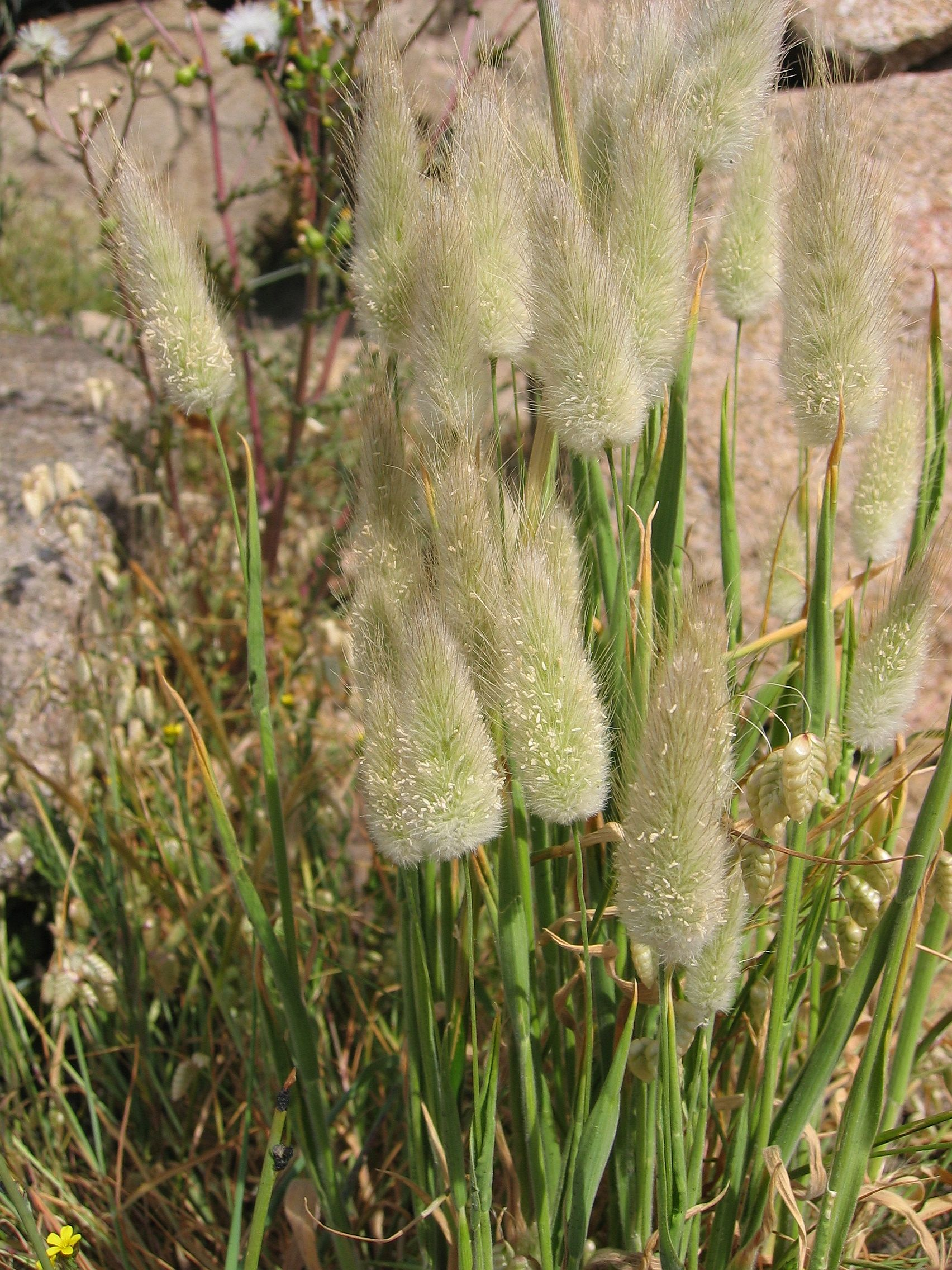

Scientific classification
- Kingdom: Plantae
- Clade: Tracheophytes
- Clade: Angiosperms
- Clade: Monocots
- Clade: Commelinids
- Order: Poales
- Family: Poaceae
- Subfamily: Pooideae
- Supertribe: Poodae
- Tribe: Poeae
- Subtribe: Aveninae
- Genus: Lagurus; L.
- Species: L. ovatus

Binomial name
- Lagurus ovatus L.

Synonyms
- Imperata ovata Tratt.; Lagurus dalmaticus Gand.; Lagurus dimorphus Gand.; Lagurus freynii Gand.; Lagurus humilis Gand.; Lagurus longifolius Gand.; Lagurus nitens Lojac.; Lagurus siculus Lojac.

= Lagurus ovatus =

Species of grass

Lagurus is a genus of Old World plants in the grass family, native to the Mediterranean Basin and nearby regions, from Madeira and the Canary Islands to Crimea and Saudi Arabia. It is also naturalized in Australia, New Zealand, the Azores, Ireland and Great Britain, and scattered locations in the Americas. The only known species is Lagurus ovatus, commonly called hare's-tail, hare's-tail grass or bunnytail. It is also grown as an ornamental plant for its attractive flower panicles.

== Description ==
Lagurus ovatus is a clump-forming annual growing to 50 cm (20 in) tall by 30 cm (12 in) tall, with pale green grassy foliage and numerous short, oval green flowerheads, turning to a buff colour as they ripen, all summer long.

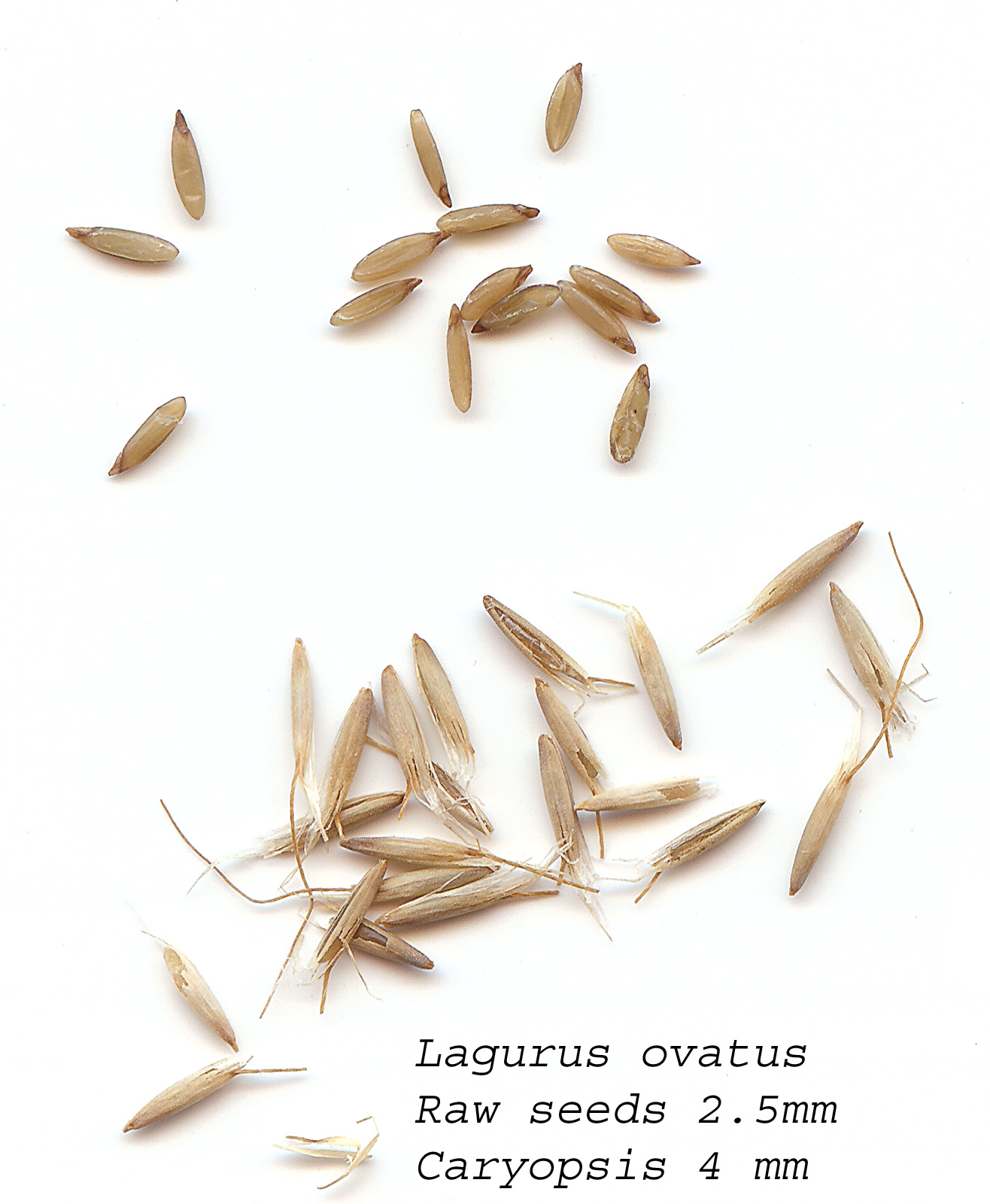
Seeds

== Diagnostic features ==
- Awns are 8–20 mm
- Leaves and sheaths are softly pubescent
- Panicle measure 1–7 × 0.5–2 cm
- Spikelets are 7–10 mm
- Stems grow erect, up to 60 cm
- Chromosome number is (2n=14)

== Distribution ==
Native to the Mediterranean and introduced into Britain, it is now thriving on sandy stretches in the islands of Guernsey and Jersey, occasionally found in Ireland and South Wales. It has become naturalized in County Wexford, Ireland, South Devon and West Sussex.

This plant is known or likely to be susceptible to barley mild mosaic bymovirus.

== Formerly included species ==
Species once considered part of Lagurus but now regarded as better suited to other genera (Cymbopogon, Imperata)

- Lagurus cylindricus – Imperata cylindrica
- Lagurus paniculatus – Cymbopogon nardus
- Lagurus schoenanthus – Cymbopogon schoenanthus
