= Hispellinus australicus =

Scientific classification
- Kingdom: Animalia
- Phylum: Arthropoda
- Class: Insecta
- Order: Coleoptera
- Suborder: Polyphaga
- Infraorder: Cucujiformia
- Family: Chrysomelidae
- Genus: Hispellinus
- Species: H. australicus

Binomial name
- Hispellinus australicus (Motschulsky, 1861)

Synonyms
- Hispa australica Motschulsky, 1861

Species of beetle

Hispellinus australicus is a species of beetle of the family Chrysomelidae. It is found in Australia (Victoria) and New Guinea.

== Life history ==
No host plant has been documented for this species.
