= Hispellinus promontorii =

Scientific classification
- Kingdom: Animalia
- Phylum: Arthropoda
- Class: Insecta
- Order: Coleoptera
- Suborder: Polyphaga
- Infraorder: Cucujiformia
- Family: Chrysomelidae
- Genus: Hispellinus
- Species: H. promontorii

Binomial name
- Hispellinus promontorii (Péringuey, 1898)

Synonyms
- Hispella promontorii Péringuey, 1898; Monochirus capensis Maulik, 1919

Species of beetle

Hispellinus promontorii is a species of beetle of the family Chrysomelidae. It is found in Congo, Guinea, Mozambique and South Africa.

== Life history ==
No host plant has been documented for this species.
