= Leptispa natalensis =

Scientific classification
- Kingdom: Animalia
- Phylum: Arthropoda
- Class: Insecta
- Order: Coleoptera
- Suborder: Polyphaga
- Infraorder: Cucujiformia
- Family: Chrysomelidae
- Genus: Leptispa
- Species: L. natalensis

Binomial name
- Leptispa natalensis Baly, 1858

Synonyms
- Lepthispa minor Uhmann, 1927

Species of beetle

Leptispa natalensis is a species of beetle of the family Chrysomelidae. It is found in Kenya, Mozambique, Nigeria, South Africa, Tanzania and Zimbabwe.

== Description ==
Adults are narrow, elongate, cylindrical and shining black.

== Life history ==
No host plant has been documented for this species.
