= Leptispa pygmaea =

Scientific classification
- Kingdom: Animalia
- Phylum: Arthropoda
- Clade: Pancrustacea
- Class: Insecta
- Order: Coleoptera
- Suborder: Polyphaga
- Infraorder: Cucujiformia
- Family: Chrysomelidae
- Genus: Leptispa
- Species: L. pygmaea

Binomial name
- Leptispa pygmaea Baly, 1858

Species of beetle

Leptispa pygmaea, commonly known as rice leaf beetle, or rice blue beetle, is a species of leaf beetle native to China (Yunnan), India (Assam, Kerala/Karnataka, Maharashtra, Meghalaya, West Bengal), Nepal, Pakistan, Sri Lanka and Vietnam. It is a major pest of Asian rice.

== Description ==
Eggs are light green, smooth and oval in shape and 0.20 mm in length. First four instars are light green with a brown head and has two spiny projections on head. Head capsule is small, and body elongated. A tail like projection called urogomphi can be found at the posterior end. Grub has three pairs of thoracic legs. Final instar grub is dirty white in color. Pupa white at first, but later turns to brown in color and about 3.89 mm in length. Adult has a metallic greenish yellow body with bluish tinge. Male has long antennae, narrow thorax and a long body, whereas female has short antennae, broad thorax and stout body. Ventrum is white in color.

== Biology ==
Adults feed on the adaxial side of tender paddy leaves and gradually roll the leaf lamina upward. Adult leaf rolls are partial and ephemeral. Then adult female oviposits clutches of up to 8 eggs within these rolled leaf lamina. The incubation period of female is about 4 to 7 days. After hatching, neonate grubs start to migrate to the leaf axil base. Grub undergoes five larval instars which ranges about 11 days. Grubs feed on leaves by scraping. This scaping can induce the formation of leaf rolls from the leaf base. All five instar stages migrate to the new leaves and form new leaf rolls. These larval leaf rolls are well formed and cohesive. Pupation occurs within the leaf roll. Pupal period is about 4 to 5 days. The longevity of adult female is about 18 to 26 days, whereas male with 33 to 43 days.

The peak population of the beetle can be found in the early tillering stage with minimum temperature and relative humidity. Grubs and adults can be controlled by the fungus Beauveria bassiana and the entomopathogenic nematode, Heterorhabditis indica.
