= Hispellinus congoanus =

Scientific classification
- Kingdom: Animalia
- Phylum: Arthropoda
- Class: Insecta
- Order: Coleoptera
- Suborder: Polyphaga
- Infraorder: Cucujiformia
- Family: Chrysomelidae
- Genus: Hispellinus
- Species: H. congoanus

Binomial name
- Hispellinus congoanus (Uhmann, 1936)

Synonyms
- Monochirus congoanus Uhmann, 1936

Species of beetle

Hispellinus congoanus is a species of beetle of the family Chrysomelidae. It is found in the Democratic Republic of the Congo and Tanzania.

== Life history ==
No host plant has been documented for this species.
