= Leptispa abdominalis =

Scientific classification
- Kingdom: Animalia
- Phylum: Arthropoda
- Class: Insecta
- Order: Coleoptera
- Suborder: Polyphaga
- Infraorder: Cucujiformia
- Family: Chrysomelidae
- Genus: Leptispa
- Species: L. abdominalis

Binomial name
- Leptispa abdominalis Baly, 1858

Synonyms
- Leptisma atripes Pic, 1925; Leptispa conicicollis Voronova & Zaitsev, 1982; Leptispa abdominalis mevidana Chen & Yu, 1964

Species of beetle

Leptispa abdominalis is a species of beetle of the family Chrysomelidae. It is found in China (Fujian, Hainan, Hebei, Guangdong), Taiwan and Vietnam.

== Description ==
Adults reach a length of about 5.9–6.8 mm. They are black, with dark brown legs and a yellow abdomen.

== Life history ==
The recorded host plants for this species are Bambusa species (including Bambusa pervariabilis) and Phyllostachys species. Larvae, pupae and adults have been found in longitudinally oriented leaf-rolls.
