= Leptispa inculta =

Scientific classification
- Kingdom: Animalia
- Phylum: Arthropoda
- Class: Insecta
- Order: Coleoptera
- Suborder: Polyphaga
- Infraorder: Cucujiformia
- Family: Chrysomelidae
- Genus: Leptispa
- Species: L. inculta

Binomial name
- Leptispa inculta Gestro, 1908

Species of beetle

Leptispa inculta is a species of beetle of the family Chrysomelidae. It is found in Congo, South Africa and Tanzania.

== Life history ==
The recorded host plants for this species are grasses (Poaceae).
