= Hispellinus =

Scientific classification
- Kingdom: Animalia
- Phylum: Arthropoda
- Class: Insecta
- Order: Coleoptera
- Suborder: Polyphaga
- Infraorder: Cucujiformia
- Family: Chrysomelidae
- Subfamily: Cassidinae
- Tribe: Hispini
- Genus: Hispellinus; Weise, 1897

Synonyms
- Monochirus Chapuis, 1875

Genus of leaf beetles

Hispellinus is a genus of beetles belonging to the family Chrysomelidae.

== Species ==
- Hispellinus albertisii (Gestro, 1897)
- Hispellinus australicus (Motschulsky, 1861)
- Hispellinus callicanthus (Bates, 1866)
- Hispellinus chinensis Gressitt, 1950
- Hispellinus coarctatus (Chapuis, 1877)
- Hispellinus congoanus (Uhmann, 1936)
- Hispellinus csikii (Gestro, 1907)
- Hispellinus fimbriatus (Chapuis, 1877)
- Hispellinus germari (Chapuis, 1877)
- Hispellinus minor (Maulik, 1919)
- Hispellinus moerens (Baly, 1874)
- Hispellinus multispinosus (Germar, 1848)
- Hispellinus promontorii (Péringuey, 1898)
- Hispellinus sthulacundus (Maulik, 1915)
- Hispellinus tuberiger Uhmann, 1949
