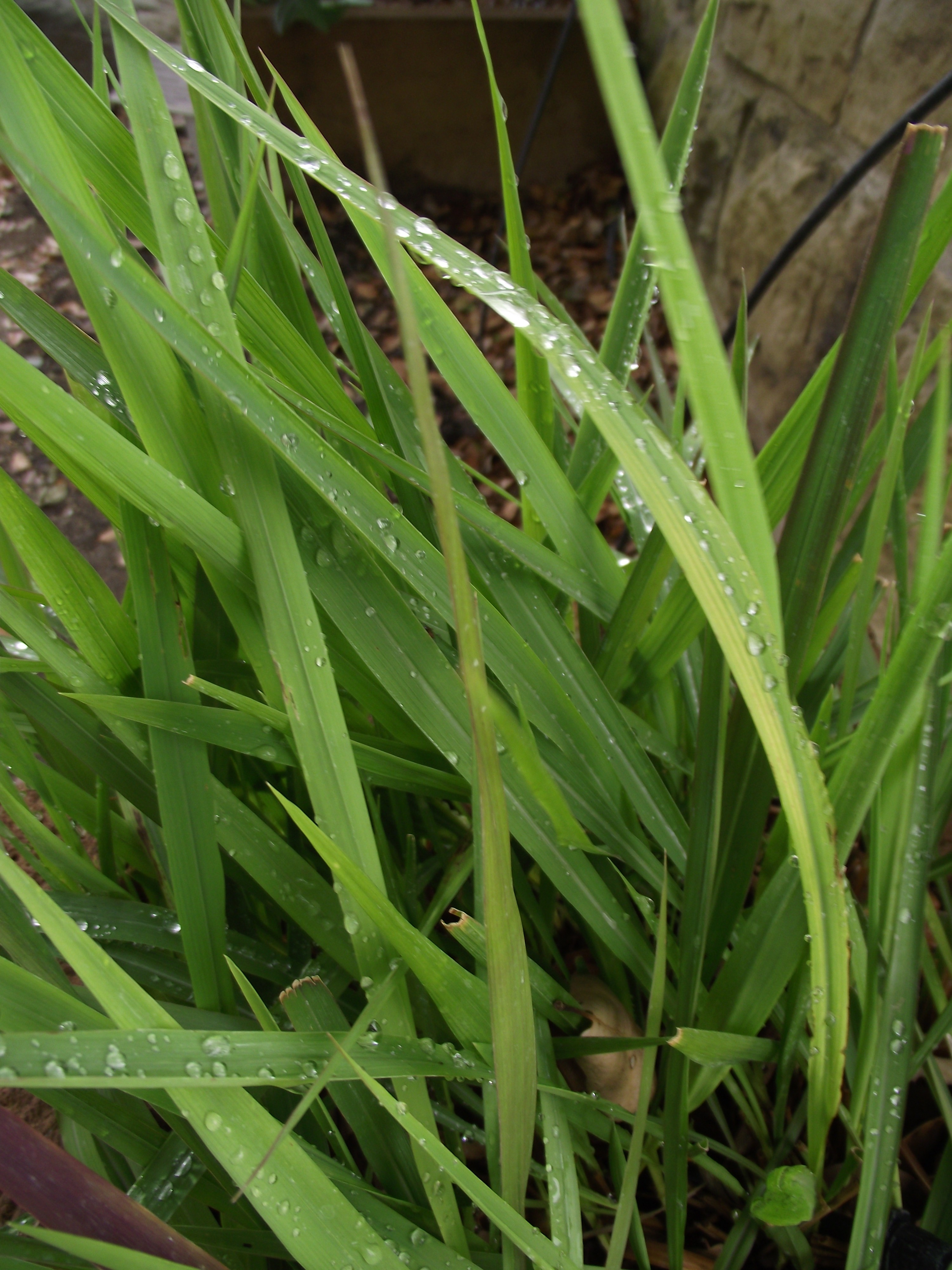

Scientific classification
- Kingdom: Plantae
- Clade: Tracheophytes
- Clade: Angiosperms
- Clade: Monocots
- Clade: Commelinids
- Order: Poales
- Family: Poaceae
- Subfamily: Panicoideae
- Genus: Imperata
- Species: I. brevifolia

Binomial name
- Imperata brevifolia Vasey

Synonyms
- Imperata hookeri (Rupr. ex Andersson) Rupr. ex Hack.

= Imperata brevifolia =

Species of flowering plant

Imperata brevifolia is a species of grass known by the common name California satintail.

== Distribution ==
It is native to the Southwestern United States from California to Texas. It is also native to northern Mexico, where it grows in arid regions where water is available.

== Description ==
Imperata brevifolia is a perennial grass growing from a hard rhizome to heights near 1.5 meters. The flat leaves are up to 50 centimeters long and 1.5 wide. The inflorescence is a narrow, cylindrical white plume up 10 to 30 centimeters long. It is filled thickly with silky white hairs and dotted with dark speckles which are the orange-brown anthers and purplish-brown stigmas of the spikelets.
