= Leptispa bouchardi =

Scientific classification
- Kingdom: Animalia
- Phylum: Arthropoda
- Class: Insecta
- Order: Coleoptera
- Suborder: Polyphaga
- Infraorder: Cucujiformia
- Family: Chrysomelidae
- Genus: Leptispa
- Species: L. bouchardi

Binomial name
- Leptispa bouchardi (Gestro, 1906)

Synonyms
- Downesia bouchardi Gestro, 1906

Species of beetle

Leptispa bouchardi is a species of beetle of the family Chrysomelidae. It is found in Indonesia (Sumatra).

== Life history ==
No host plant has been documented for this species.
