= Hispellinus chinensis =

Scientific classification
- Kingdom: Animalia
- Phylum: Arthropoda
- Class: Insecta
- Order: Coleoptera
- Suborder: Polyphaga
- Infraorder: Cucujiformia
- Family: Chrysomelidae
- Genus: Hispellinus
- Species: H. chinensis

Binomial name
- Hispellinus chinensis Gressitt, 1950

Species of beetle

Hispellinus chinensis is a species of beetle of the family Chrysomelidae. It is found in China (Hunan, Guangdong, Sichuan) and South Korea.

== Life history ==
No host plant has been documented for this species.
