= Leptispa angulata =

Scientific classification
- Kingdom: Animalia
- Phylum: Arthropoda
- Class: Insecta
- Order: Coleoptera
- Suborder: Polyphaga
- Infraorder: Cucujiformia
- Family: Chrysomelidae
- Genus: Leptispa
- Species: L. angulata

Binomial name
- Leptispa angulata Uhmann, 1954

Species of beetle

Leptispa angulata is a species of beetle of the family Chrysomelidae. It is found in Angola and the Democratic Republic of the Congo.

== Life history ==
No host plant has been documented for this species.
