= Leptispa anceyi =

Scientific classification
- Kingdom: Animalia
- Phylum: Arthropoda
- Class: Insecta
- Order: Coleoptera
- Suborder: Polyphaga
- Infraorder: Cucujiformia
- Family: Chrysomelidae
- Genus: Leptispa
- Species: L. anceyi

Binomial name
- Leptispa anceyi (Pic, 1924)

Synonyms
- Agonia (Paradownesia) anceyi Pic, 1924

Species of beetle

Leptispa anceyi is a species of beetle of the family Chrysomelidae. It is found in Vietnam.

== Life history ==
No host plant has been documented for this species.
