= Leptispa parallela =

Scientific classification
- Kingdom: Animalia
- Phylum: Arthropoda
- Class: Insecta
- Order: Coleoptera
- Suborder: Polyphaga
- Infraorder: Cucujiformia
- Family: Chrysomelidae
- Genus: Leptispa
- Species: L. parallela

Binomial name
- Leptispa parallela (Gestro, 1899)

Synonyms
- Downesia (Paradownesia) parallela Gestro, 1899; Leptispa parallela yunnana Chen & Yu, 1964

Species of beetle

Leptispa parallela is a species of beetle of the family Chrysomelidae. It is found in China (Yunnan) and India (Sikkim).

== Life history ==
No host plant has been documented for this species.
