= Leptispa cornuta =

Scientific classification
- Kingdom: Animalia
- Phylum: Arthropoda
- Class: Insecta
- Order: Coleoptera
- Suborder: Polyphaga
- Infraorder: Cucujiformia
- Family: Chrysomelidae
- Genus: Leptispa
- Species: L. cornuta

Binomial name
- Leptispa cornuta Uhmann, 1936

Species of beetle

Leptispa cornuta is a species of beetle of the family Chrysomelidae. It is found in the Democratic Republic of the Congo.

== Life history ==
The recorded host plants for this species are grasses (Poaceae).
