= Leptispa quadraticollis =

Scientific classification
- Kingdom: Animalia
- Phylum: Arthropoda
- Class: Insecta
- Order: Coleoptera
- Suborder: Polyphaga
- Infraorder: Cucujiformia
- Family: Chrysomelidae
- Genus: Leptispa
- Species: L. quadraticollis

Binomial name
- Leptispa quadraticollis (Fairmaire, 1884)

Synonyms
- Parallelispa quadraticollis Fairmaire, 1884

Species of beetle

Leptispa quadraticollis is a species of beetle of the family Chrysomelidae. It is found in Madagascar.

== Life history ==
No host plant has been documented for this species.
