= Hispellinus coarctatus =

Scientific classification
- Kingdom: Animalia
- Phylum: Arthropoda
- Class: Insecta
- Order: Coleoptera
- Suborder: Polyphaga
- Infraorder: Cucujiformia
- Family: Chrysomelidae
- Genus: Hispellinus
- Species: H. coarctatus

Binomial name
- Hispellinus coarctatus (Chapuis, 1877)

Synonyms
- Monochirus coarctatus Chapuis, 1877

Species of beetle

Hispellinus coarctatus is a species of beetle of the family Chrysomelidae. It is found in Australia (New South Wales) and New Guinea.

== Life history ==
The recorded host plants for this species are grasses (Poaceae).
