= Hispellinus fimbriatus =

Scientific classification
- Kingdom: Animalia
- Phylum: Arthropoda
- Class: Insecta
- Order: Coleoptera
- Suborder: Polyphaga
- Infraorder: Cucujiformia
- Family: Chrysomelidae
- Genus: Hispellinus
- Species: H. fimbriatus

Binomial name
- Hispellinus fimbriatus (Chapuis, 1877)

Synonyms
- Monochirus fimbriatus Chapuis, 1877

Species of beetle

Hispellinus fimbriatus is a species of beetle of the family Chrysomelidae. It is found in Australia (New South Wales, Tasmania, Victoria).

== Life history ==
No host plant has been documented for this species.
