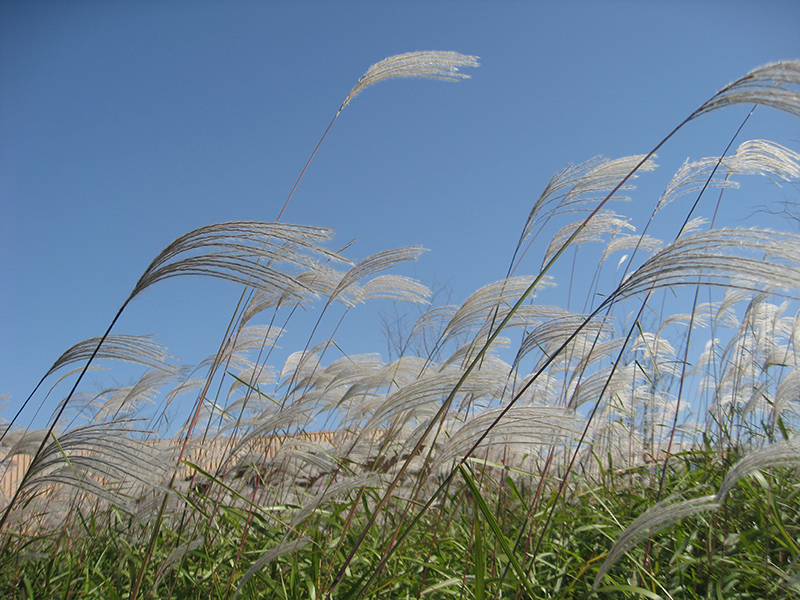

Scientific classification
- Kingdom: Plantae
- Clade: Tracheophytes
- Clade: Angiosperms
- Clade: Monocots
- Clade: Commelinids
- Order: Poales
- Family: Poaceae
- Subfamily: Panicoideae
- Genus: Miscanthus
- Species: M. sacchariflorus

Binomial name
- Miscanthus sacchariflorus (Maxim.) Benth. & Hook.f. ex Franch.

Synonyms
- Homotypic Synonyms: Imperata sacchariflora Maxim.; Triarrhena sacchariflora (Maxim.) Nakai; Heterotypic Synonyms: Imperata eulalioides Miq.; Miscanthus hackelii Nakai; Miscanthus saccharifer Benth.; Miscanthus sacchariflorus var. gracilis Y.N.Lee; Miscanthus sacchariflorus f. latifolius Adati; Miscanthus sacchariflorus f. purpurascens Y.N.Lee; Triarrhena hackelii (Nakai) Nakai

= Miscanthus sacchariflorus =

Species of grass

Miscanthus sacchariflorus, the Amur silvergrass, is a species of flowering plant in the family Poaceae. It is native to temperate Amur Oblast, China, Japan, Khabarovsk Krai, Korea, Mongolia, and Primorye Krai and is found as an introduced species in Austria, Canada, Germany, Poland, and the United States.

Its culms are erect, 90 centimetres (35 in) – 250 centimetres (98 in) in height and 5 millimetres (0.20 in) – 8 millimetres (0.31 in) in diameter.
