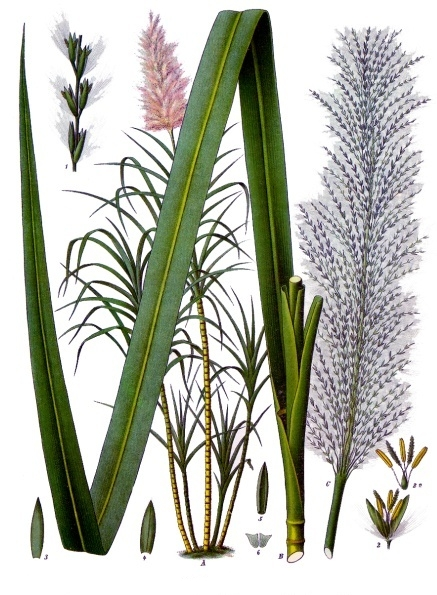
- Saccharum officinarum

Scientific classification
- Kingdom: Plantae
- Clade: Tracheophytes
- Clade: Angiosperms
- Clade: Monocots
- Clade: Commelinids
- Order: Poales
- Family: Poaceae
- Subfamily: Panicoideae
- Supertribe: Andropogonodae
- Tribe: Andropogoneae
- Subtribe: Saccharinae
- Genus: Saccharum; L.

Type species
- Saccharum officinarum L.

Synonyms
- Saccharifera Stokes; Syllepis E.Fourn.

= Saccharum =

Genus of grasses

Saccharum is a genus of tall perennial plants of the broomsedge tribe within the grass family.

The genus is widespread across tropical, subtropical, and warm temperate regions in Africa, Eurasia, Australia, the Americas, and assorted oceanic islands. Several species are cultivated and naturalized in areas outside their native habitats.

Saccharum includes the sugarcanes. They have stout, jointed, fibrous stalks that are generally rich in sugar, and measure two to six m (6 to 19 ft) tall. All sugarcane species interbreed and the major commercial cultivars are complex hybrids.

== Species ==
As of September 2021, Plants of the World Online accepted the following species:

- Saccharum alopecuroidum (L.) Nutt. - southeastern USA
- Saccharum angustifolium (Nees) Trin. - South America
- Saccharum asperum (Nees) Steud. - South America
- Saccharum baldwinii Spreng. - southeastern USA
- Saccharum beccarii (Stapf) Cope - Sumatra
- Saccharum brevibarbe (Michx.) Pers. - southeastern USA
- Saccharum coarctatum (Fern.) R. Webster - southeastern USA
- Saccharum contortum (Baldwin ex Elliott) Nutt. - southeastern USA
- Saccharum fallax Balansa - China, Assam, southeast Asia
- Saccharum filifolium Steud. - Afghanistan, Himalayas
- Saccharum formosanum (Stapf) Ohwi - southern China
- Saccharum giganteum (Walt.) Pers. - southeastern USA, Cuba, Jamaica, Paraguay, Argentina
- Saccharum griffithii Munro ex Aitch. - from Yemen to Bangladesh
- Saccharum intermedium Welker & Peichoto
- Saccharum kajkaiense (Melderis) Melderis - Oman, Iran, Afghanistan, Pakistan
- Saccharum longesetosum (Andersson) V.Naray. ex Bor - China, Himalayas, Indochina
- Saccharum maximum (Brongn.) Trin. - Pacific Islands
- Saccharum narenga (Nees ex Steud.) Hack. - China, Indian Subcontinent, Indochina, Ethiopia
- Saccharum officinarum L. - New Guinea; naturalized in many warm places
- Saccharum robustum Brandes & Jesw. ex Grassl - New Guinea
- Saccharum rufipilum Steud. - China, Indian Subcontinent, Indochina
- Saccharum sikkimense (Hook.f.) V.Naray. ex Bor - eastern Himalayas
- Saccharum × sinense Roxb. – China
- Saccharum spontaneum L. - Asia, Africa, Sicily, Papuasia
- Saccharum stewartii Rajesw., R.R.Rao & Arti Garg - western Himalayas
- Saccharum velutinum (Holttum) Cope - Peninsular Malaysia
- Saccharum villosum Steud. - South America, Mesoamerica
- Saccharum wardii (Bor) Bor ex Cope - Assam, Bhutan, Myanmar
- Saccharum williamsii (Bor) Bor ex Cope - Nepal

Placed in Lasiorhachis by Plants of the World Online as of September 2021:

- Saccharum hildebrandtii (Hack.) Clayton → Lasiorhachis hildebrandtii
- Saccharum perrieri (A.Camus) Clayton. → Lasiorhachis perrieri
- Saccharum viguieri (A.Camus) Clayton → Lasiorhachis viguieri

Placed in Tripidium by Plants of the World Online as of September 2021:

- Saccharum arundinaceum Retz. - East + South + Southeast Asia; New Guinea → Tripidium arundinaceum
- Saccharum bengalense Retz. - India, Pakistan, Iran, Afghanistan → Tripidium bengalense
- Saccharum kanashiroi (Ohwi) Ohwi - Ryukyu Islands → Tripidium kanashiroi
- Saccharum procerum Roxb. - China, Himalayas, Indochina → Tripidium procerum
- Saccharum ravennae (L.) L. - Europe, Asia, Africa → Tripidium ravennae
- Saccharum strictum (Host) Spreng. - from Italy to Iran → Tripidium strictum

=== Formerly included ===
Numerous species are now considered better suited in other genera: Andropogon, Chloris, Digitaria, Eriochrysis, Eulalia, Gynerium, Hemarthria, Imperata, Lophopogon, Melinis, Miscanthus, Panicum, Pappophorum, Paspalum, Perotis, Pogonatherum, Pseudopogonatherum, Spodiopogon, and Tricholaena.

== See also ==
- Domesticated plants and animals of Austronesia
