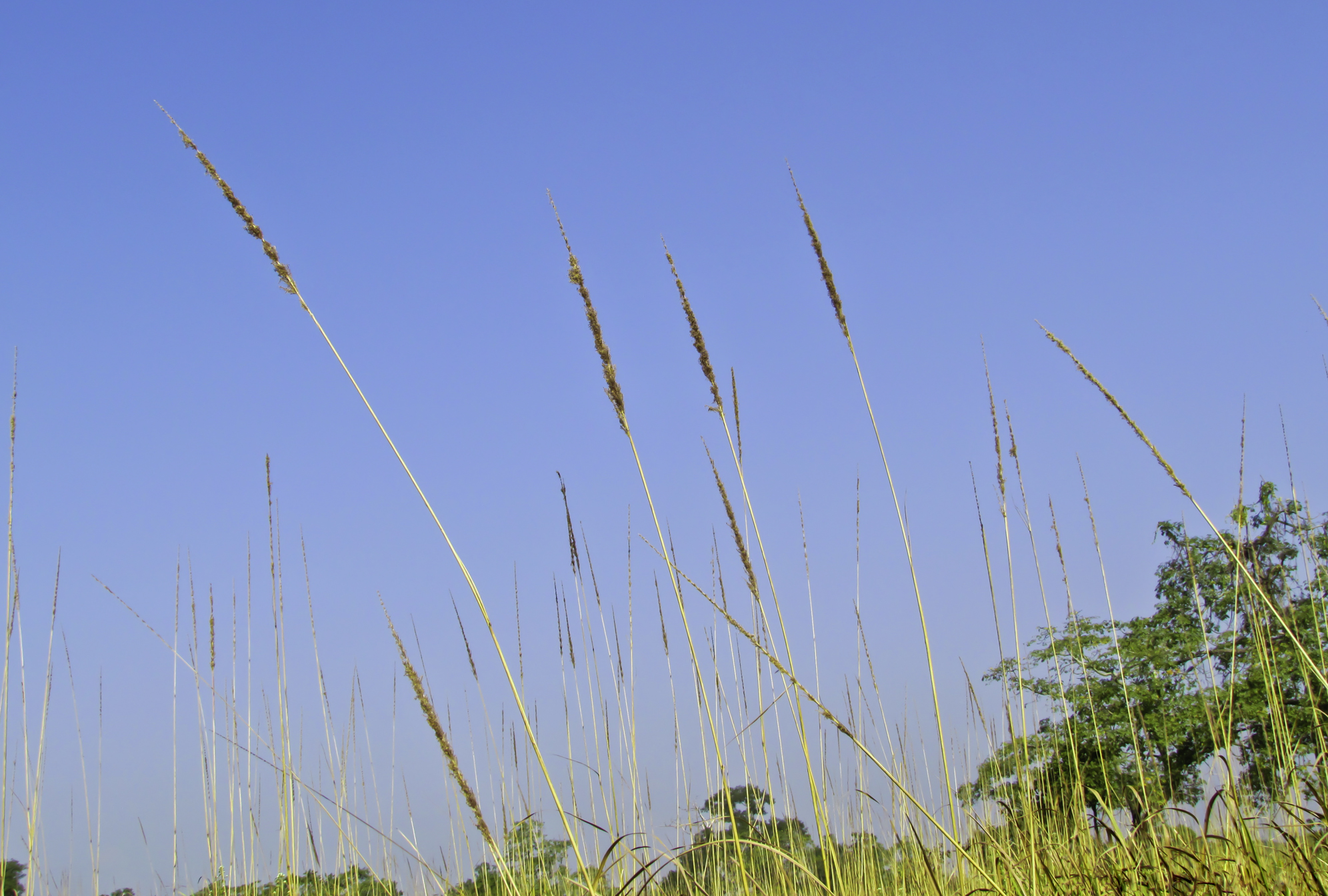

Scientific classification
- Kingdom: Plantae
- Clade: Embryophytes
- Clade: Tracheophytes
- Clade: Spermatophytes
- Clade: Angiosperms
- Clade: Monocots
- Clade: Commelinids
- Order: Poales
- Family: Poaceae
- Subfamily: Panicoideae
- Genus: Miscanthus
- Species: M. fuscus

Binomial name
- Miscanthus fuscus (Roxb.) Benth.

Synonyms
- Tricholaena fusca (Roxb.) Schult. Sclerostachya ridleyi (Hack.) A.Camus; Sclerostachya milroyi Bor; Sclerostachya fusca (Roxb.) A.Camus; Saccharum ridleyi Hack. Saccharum nareya Benth. Saccharum modhara Hook.f. Saccharum fuscum Roxb. Saccharum brunneum Desv. Miscanthus ridleyi (Hack.) I.M.Turner; Eriochrysis fusca (Roxb.) Trin. Eriochrysis attenuata Nees ex Steud. Arundo orientalis Mill.

= Miscanthus fuscus =

Species of grass

Miscanthus fuscus, one of three species known as elephant grass, is a South Asian grass species first described by William Roxburgh, and was given its current name by George Bentham. Miscanthus fuscus is included in the genus silvergrasses, and the grass family. No subspecies are listed in the Catalogue of Life.

The bamboo-like plant grows rapidly up to 3 metres high, generating a high yield of biomass with low ash content, suitable for use in electricity generation.
