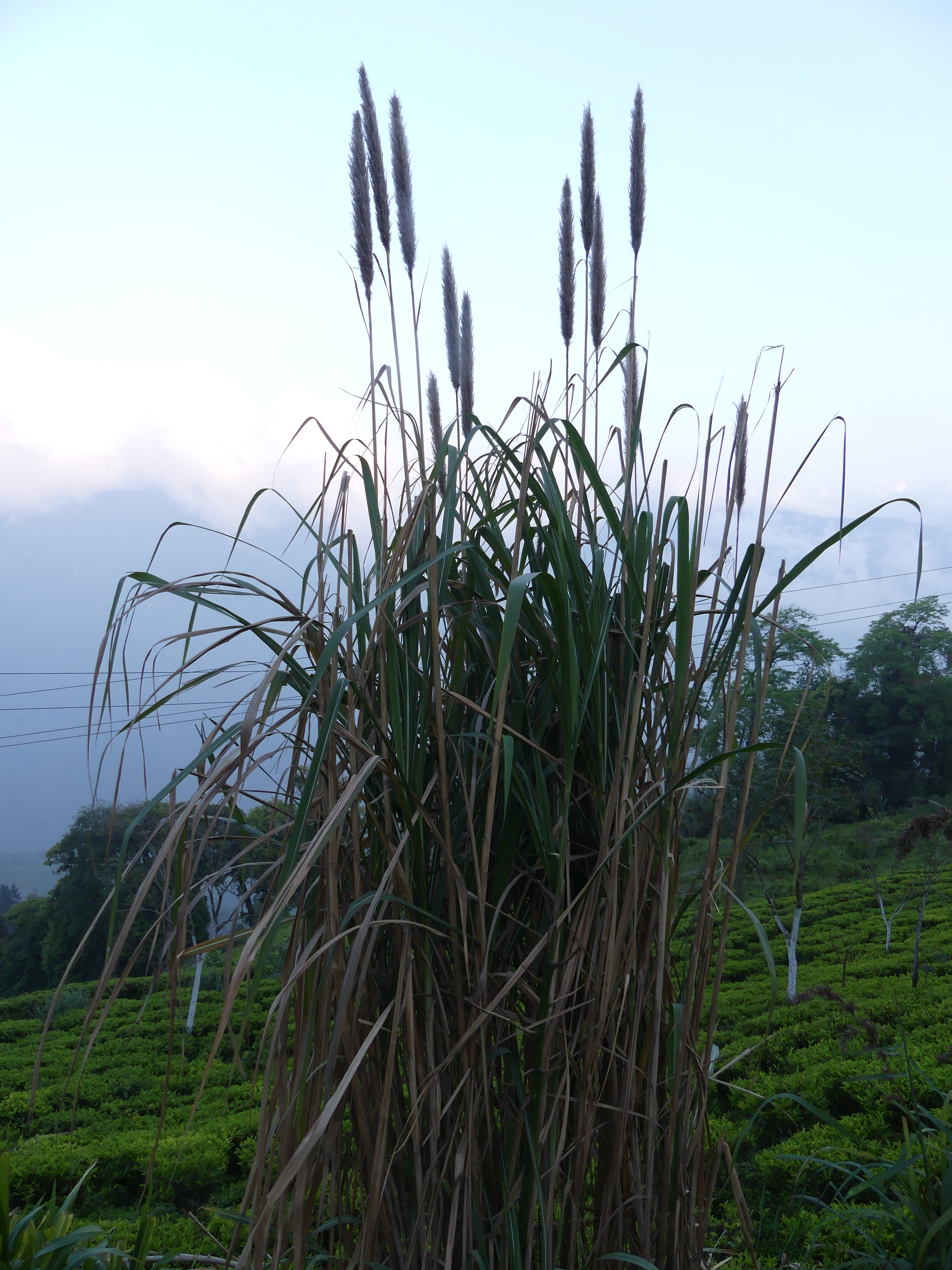

Scientific classification
- Kingdom: Plantae
- Clade: Embryophytes
- Clade: Tracheophytes
- Clade: Spermatophytes
- Clade: Angiosperms
- Clade: Monocots
- Clade: Commelinids
- Order: Poales
- Family: Poaceae
- Subfamily: Panicoideae
- Genus: Tripidium
- Species: T. bengalense

Binomial name
- Tripidium bengalense (Retz.) H.Scholz

Synonyms
- Erianthus bengalensis (Retz.) Bharadw., Basu Chaudh. & Sinha; Erianthus ciliaris (Andersson) Jeswiet; Erianthus elegans (Jeswiet) Rümke; Erianthus munja (Roxb.) Jeswiet; Erianthus sara (Roxb.) Rümke; Imperata sara (Roxb.) Schult.; Ripidium bengalense (Retz.) Grassl; Saccharum bengalense Retz.; Saccharum ciliare Andersson; Saccharum elegans (Jeswiet) Veldkamp; Saccharum munja Roxb.; Saccharum sara Roxb.

= Tripidium bengalense =

Species of plant

Tripidium bengalense, synonym Saccharum bengalense, with the common names munj sweetcane, baruwa sugarcane or baruwa grass, is a plant of the genus Tripidium native to Iran, Afghanistan, Pakistan, Northern India, Nepal, Bangladesh and Myanmar.

A primary native distribution area is northeastern India, particularly in Assam within the Terai-Duar grasslands in the foothills of the Himalayas.

== Description ==
This is a small species of sugarcane bamboo grass, growing 2–3 feet (0.61–0.91 m) in height. The plant is colored pinkish-green.

It is a food source for animals such as the Indian rhinoceros and the pygmy hog.

== Uses ==
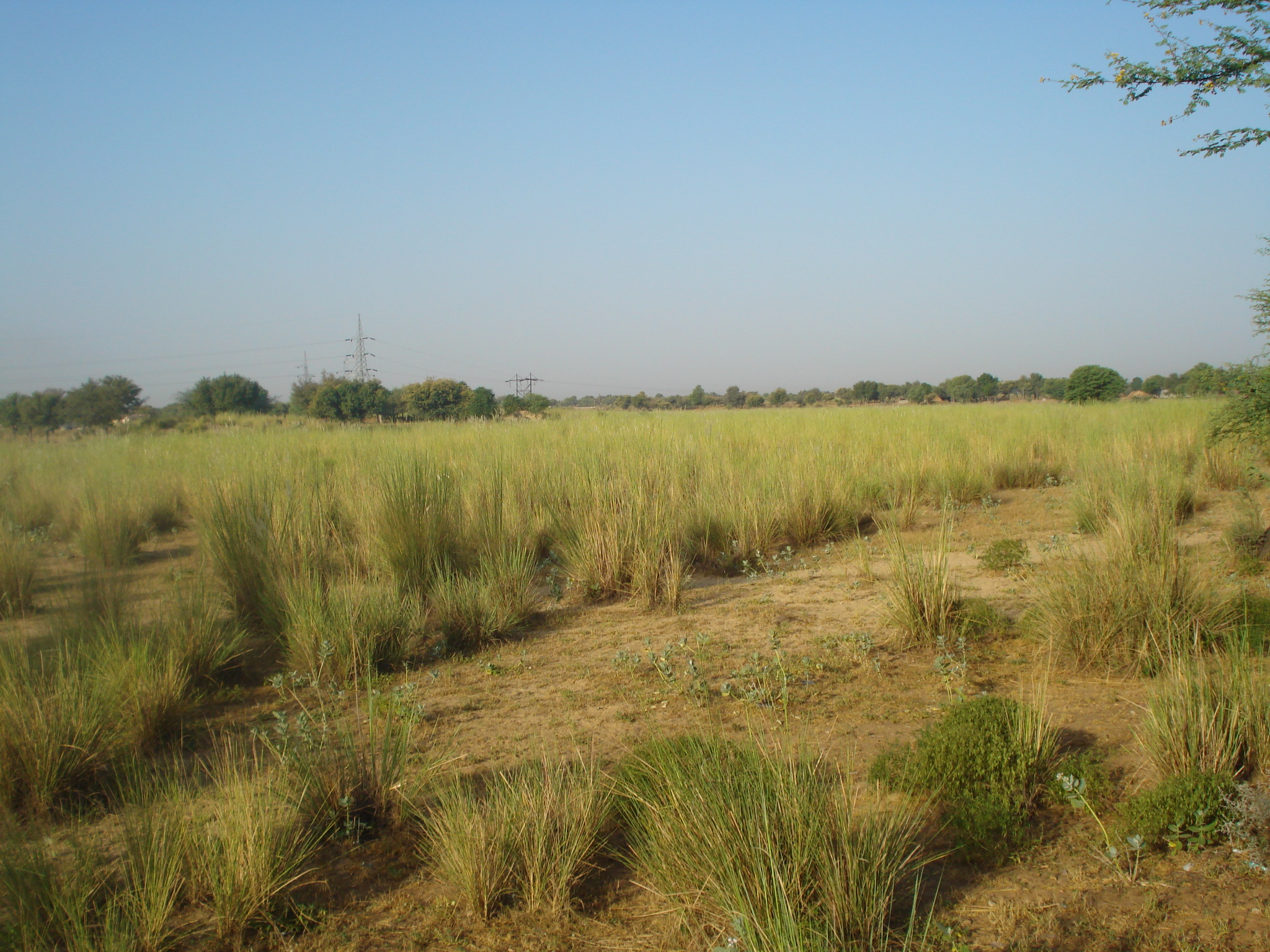
Growing along a river bank

The species is used as a raw material for thatching roofs. It is used for making baskets. Its fibre is used for making ropes. It is one of the ecologically successful native colonizer of abandoned mines. It forms pure patches on rocky habitats with skeletal soils. It forms extensive root network that binds the soil/pebbles and forms tall thick clumps with high biomass tufts. It is used by low income locals for making ropes, hand fans, baskets, brooms, mat, hut and shields for crop protection. It is a choice species for stabilizing erosion-prone rugged slopes and their conversion into biologically productive sites of high socio-economic values.
