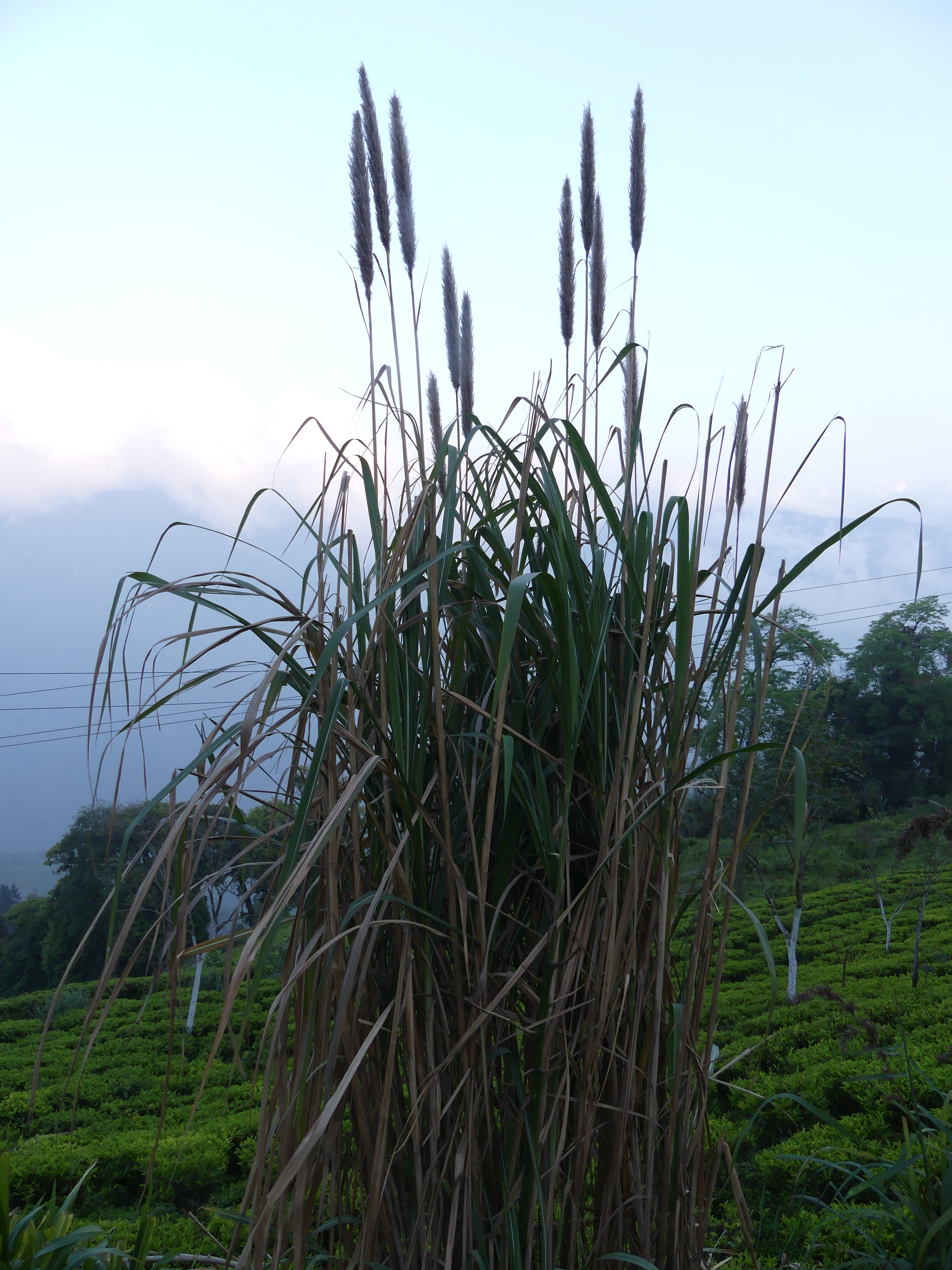
- Tripidium bengalense in north Bengal

Scientific classification
- Kingdom: Plantae
- Clade: Tracheophytes
- Clade: Angiosperms
- Clade: Monocots
- Clade: Commelinids
- Order: Poales
- Family: Poaceae
- Subfamily: Panicoideae
- Supertribe: Andropogonodae
- Tribe: Andropogoneae
- Subtribe: Saccharinae
- Genus: Tripidium; H.Scholz

Species
- See text.

Synonyms
- Ripidium Trin., nom. illeg.

= Tripidium =

Genus of plants

Tripidium is a genus of flowering plant in the Poaceae (or grass) family of plants. The genus is native to southern Europe, North Africa, and parts of Asia with the native distribution of genus extending from the western parts of Mediterranean (including Spain and Morocco) and Western Sahara, to the Korean peninsula and the island of New Guinea at the eastern-most extent of its distribution.

The genus name was first published by Hildemar Wolfgang Scholz in 2006 as a replacement for the illegitimate name Ripidium.

== Species ==
As of September 2021, Plants of the World Online accepted the following species:

- Tripidium arundinaceum (Retz.) Welker, Voronts. & E.A.Kellogg
- Tripidium bengalense (Retz.) H.Scholz
- Tripidium kanashiroi (Ohwi) Welker, Voronts. & E.A.Kellogg
- Tripidium procerum (Roxb.) Welker, Voronts. & E.A.Kellogg
- Tripidium ravennae (L.) H.Scholz
- Tripidium strictum (Host) H.Scholz
