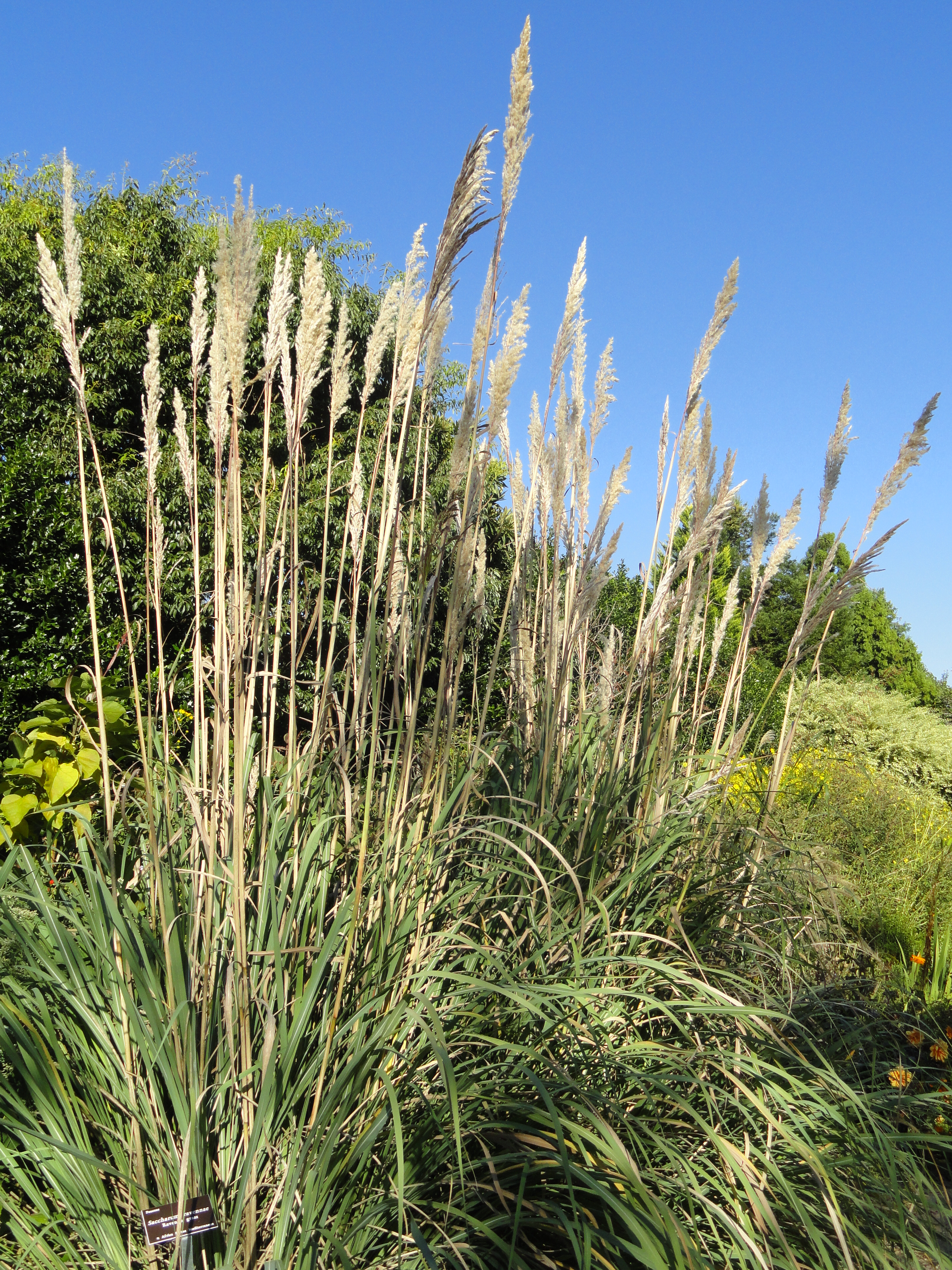

Scientific classification
- Kingdom: Plantae
- Clade: Tracheophytes
- Clade: Angiosperms
- Clade: Monocots
- Clade: Commelinids
- Order: Poales
- Family: Poaceae
- Subfamily: Panicoideae
- Genus: Tripidium
- Species: T. ravennae

Binomial name
- Tripidium ravennae (L.) H.Scholz

Synonyms
- Agrostis ravennae (L.) P.Beauv.; Andropogon caudatus M.Bieb.; Andropogon ravennae L.; Erianthus elephantinus Hook.f.; Erianthus jamaicensis (Trin.) Andersson; Erianthus monstieri Carrière; Erianthus parviflorus Pilg.; Erianthus purpurascens Andersson; Erianthus ravennae (L.) P.Beauv.; Erianthus ravennae var. jamaicensis (Trin.) Hack.; Erianthus ravennae subsp. parviflorus (Pilg.) H.Scholz; Erianthus scriptorius Bubani; Ripidium elephantinum (Hook.f.) Grassl; Ripidium ravennae (L.) Trin.; Saccharum elephantinum (Hook.f.) V.Naray. ex Bor; Saccharum jamaicense Trin.; Saccharum parviflorum (Pilg.) Pilg.; Saccharum ravennae (L.) L.; Tripidium ravennae subsp. parviflorum (Pilg.) H.Scholz

= Tripidium ravennae =

Ravennagrass

Species of grass

Tripidium ravennae, synonym Saccharum ravennae (and many others), with the common names ravennagrass and elephant grass, is a species of grass in the genus Tripidium. It is native to Southern Europe, Western Asia and South Asia. It is known in North America as an introduced species, where it is sometimes an invasive and troublesome noxious weed.

== Uses ==
Ravennagrass is a large, aggressive grass that has been sold in nurseries for use as an ornamental grass in gardens, and for stabilizing soil to prevent erosion. It is sold under the name "hardy pampas grass."

== Invasive species ==
Tripidium ravennae is now established as an invasive species in several parts of North America, including Glen Canyon National Recreation Area in Utah, the Rio Grande Valley State Park in Albuquerque, New Mexico, and parts of California. It grows in the moist soil of riparian habitats including marshes and riverbanks.

This perennial grass grows in large, dense clumps from a network of rhizomes. It produces erect stems which can reach 13 ft (4m) in height. The serrated leaves are up to a meter long. The inflorescence is a plume-like panicle of spikelets covered in white or pale-colored silky hairs.
