= Tripidium arundinaceum =

Scientific classification
- Kingdom: Plantae
- Clade: Tracheophytes
- Clade: Angiosperms
- Clade: Monocots
- Clade: Commelinids
- Order: Poales
- Family: Poaceae
- Subfamily: Panicoideae
- Genus: Tripidium
- Species: T. arundinaceum

Binomial name
- Tripidium arundinaceum (Retz.) Welker, Voronts. & E.A.Kellogg

Synonyms
- Erianthus arundinaceus (Retz.) Jeswiet; Erianthus griffithii var. trichophyllus Hand.-Mazz.; Erianthus trichophyllus (Hand.-Mazz.) Hand.-Mazz.; Imperata exaltata (Roxb.) Brongn.; Ripidium arundinaceum (Retz.) Grassl; Saccharum arundinaceum Retz.; Saccharum arundinaceum var. trichophyllum (Hand.-Mazz.) S.M.Phillips & S.L.Chen; Saccharum barbicostatum Ohwi; Saccharum exaltatum Roxb.; Saccharum soltwedelii Kobus

Species of grass

Tripidium arundinaceum, synonym Saccharum arundinaceum, commonly known as hardy sugar cane, is a grass native to tropical and subtropical Asia from India to Korea and New Guinea.

In the Tamil language it is known as நாணல் − nāṇal. In the Assamese language it is known as মেগেলা কুঁহিয়াৰ − meghela kuhiyaar, with the word kuhiyaar meaning sugarcane.
