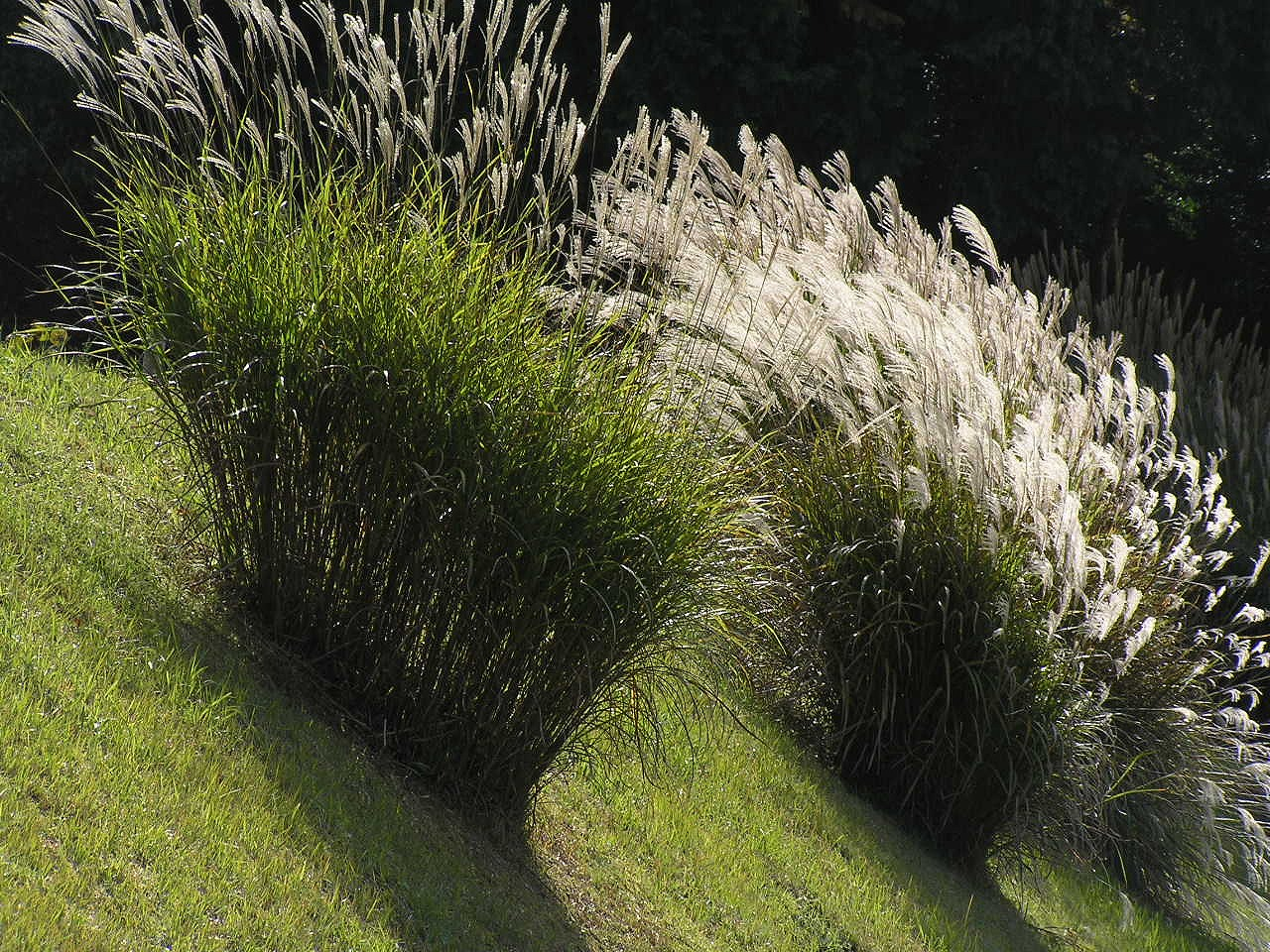
- Miscanthus sinensis

Scientific classification
- Kingdom: Plantae
- Clade: Tracheophytes
- Clade: Angiosperms
- Clade: Monocots
- Clade: Commelinids
- Order: Poales
- Family: Poaceae
- Subfamily: Panicoideae
- Supertribe: Andropogonodae
- Tribe: Andropogoneae
- Subtribe: Saccharinae
- Genus: Miscanthus; Andersson (1855)

Type species
- Miscanthus capensis (Nees) Andersson

Synonyms
- Diandranthus L.Liu (1997); Rubimons B.S.Sun (1997); Sclerostachya (Andersson ex Hack.) A.Camus (1922); Triarrhena (Maxim.) Nakai (1950); Xiphagrostis Coville ex Safford (1905)

= Miscanthus =

Genus of grasses

Miscanthus, or silvergrass, is a genus of African, Eurasian, and Pacific Island plants in the grass family, Poaceae. The name is derived from the Greek words "miskos", meaning "stem", and "anthos", meaning "flower", in reference to the stalked spikelets on plants of this genus. Several species are known for their height and biomass production, and may be used as ornamental grasses.

== Species ==
14 species are accepted.

- Miscanthus depauperatus Merr. – the Philippines
- Miscanthus ecklonii (Nees) Mabb. – southern Africa
- Miscanthus floridulus (Labill.) Warb. ex K.Schum. & Lauterb. – China, Japan, Southeast Asia, Pacific Islands
- Miscanthus fuscus (Roxb.) Benth. – Indian subcontinent, Indochina, Pen Malaysia
- Miscanthus × longiberbis (Hack.) Nakai – northeastern China, Korea, and Japan
- Miscanthus lutarioriparius L.Liu ex S.L.Chen & Renvoize – Hubei, Hunan
- Miscanthus nepalensis (Trin.) Hack. – Indian Subcontinent, Tibet, Yunnan, Myanmar, Vietnam, Peninsular Malaysia
- Miscanthus nudipes (Griseb.) Hack. – Assam, Bhutan, Nepal, Sikkim, Tibet, Yunnan
- Miscanthus oligostachyus Stapf. – Korea, Japan
- Miscanthus paniculatus (B.S.Sun) S.L.Chen & Renvoize – Guizhou, Sichuan, Yunnan
- Miscanthus sacchariflorus (Maxim.) Benth. & Hook.f. ex Franch. – Korea, Japan, northeastern China, Russian Far East
- Miscanthus sinensis Andersson – Korea, Japan, China, Southeast Asia, Russian Far East; naturalized in New Zealand, North America, South America
- Miscanthus tinctorius (Steud.) Hack. – Japan
- Miscanthus villosus Y.C.Liu & H.Peng – Yunnan
- Miscanthus wangpicheonensis T.I.Heo & J.S.Kim – Korea

=== Former species ===
Several species formerly placed in genus Miscanthus are now placed in other genera, including Chloris, Miscanthidium, Pseudopogonatherum, Saccharum, and Spodiopogon.

- Miscanthus affinis – Pseudopogonatherum quadrinerve
- Miscanthus cotulifer – Spodiopogon cotulifer
- Miscanthus junceus – Miscanthidium junceum
- Miscanthus polydactylos – Stapfochloa elata
- Miscanthus rufipilus – Saccharum rufipilum
- Miscanthus tanakae – Pseudopogonatherum speciosum
- Miscanthus violaceus (K.Schum.) Pilg. – Miscanthidium violaceum (K.Schum.) Robyns

== Physiology ==
A wide variety in cold tolerance occurs in the genus. M. × giganteus is especially vulnerable to cold, and a cultivar of M. sinensis has the best known cold tolerance.

== Miscanthus sinensis ==
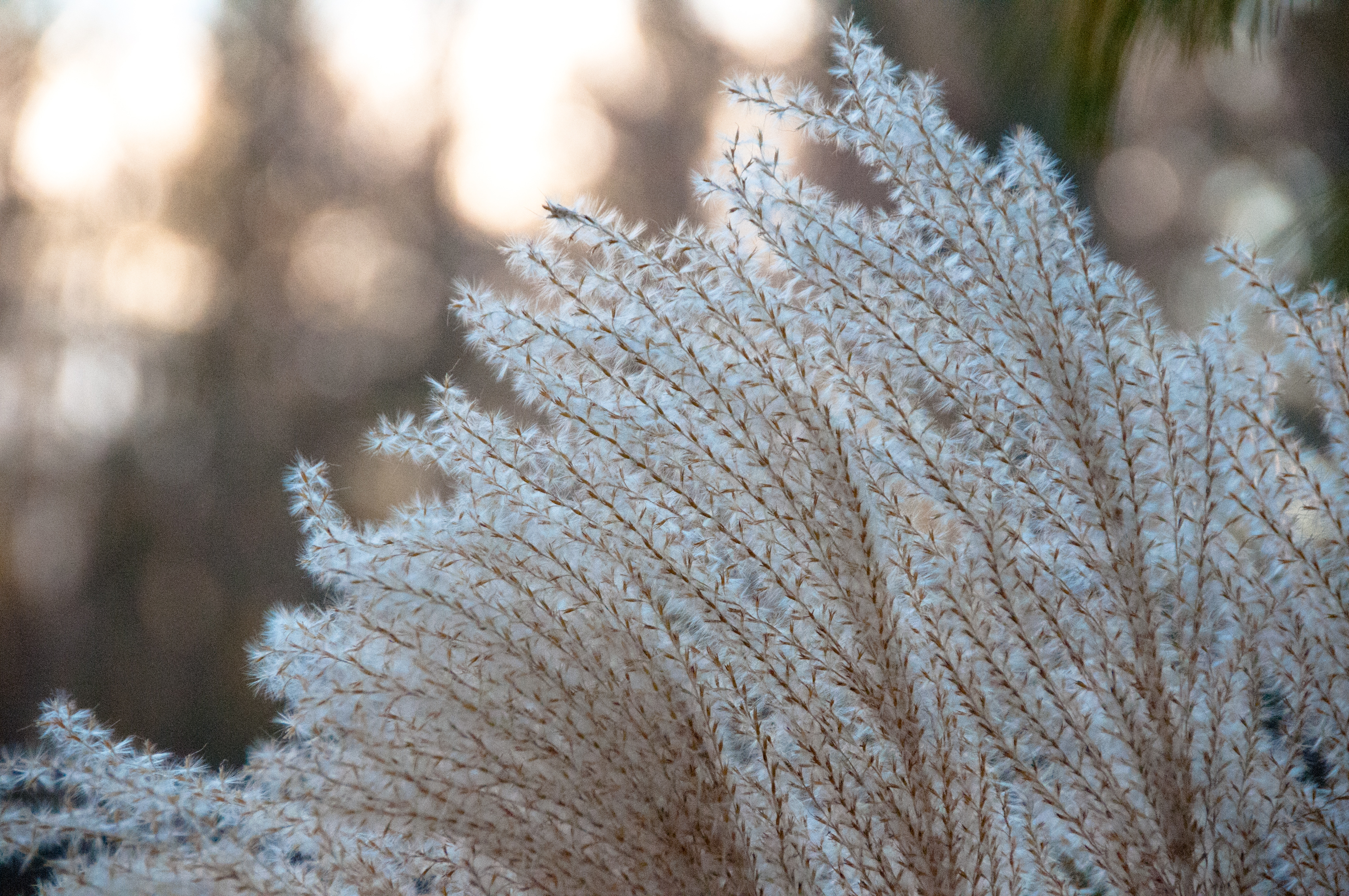
Winter miscanthus, an ornamental grass, growing in southern Ontario, Canada

M. sinensis is widely cultivated as an ornamental plant, and is the source of several cultivars. In Japan, where it is known as susuki (すすき), it is considered an iconic plant of late summer and early autumn. It is mentioned in the Man'yōshū (VIII:1538) as one of the seven autumn flowers (aki no nana kusa, 秋の七草). It is used for the eighth month in hanafuda playing cards. It is decorated with bush clover for the Mid-Autumn Festival. Miscanthus has also excellent fiber properties for papermaking.

== Miscanthus × giganteus ==
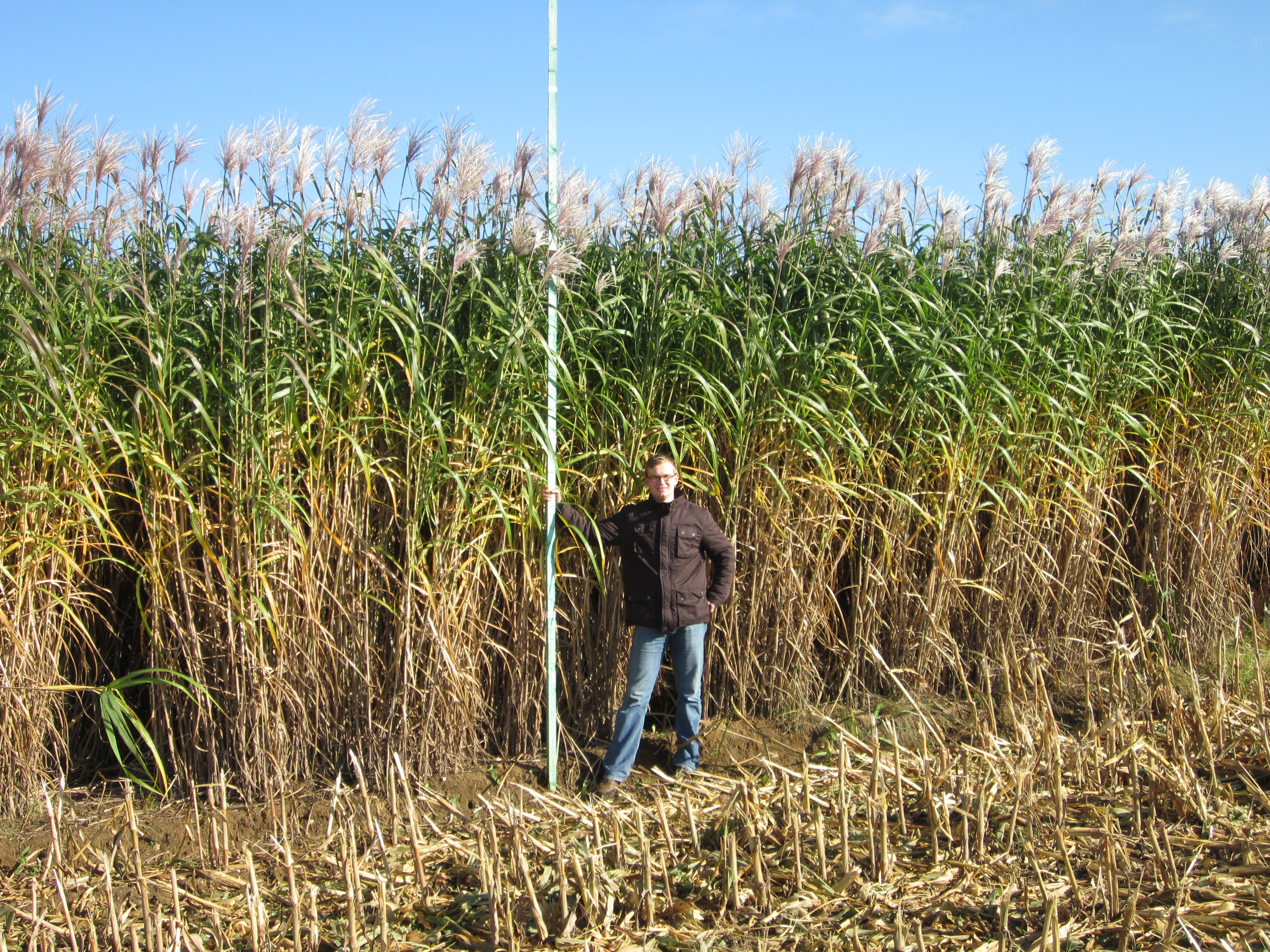
M. × giganteus, an energy crop, growing in Germany

Miscanthus × giganteus (Miscanthus giganteus, giant miscanthus) (Note: p. 71, "Recent classification work at the Royal Botanic Gardens at Kew, England has designated it as M. x giganteus […], a hybrid of M. sinensis […] and M. sacchariflorus […]") is a highly productive, rhizomatous C4 perennial grass, originating from Asia. (Note: p. 71, "M. × giganteus is a highly productive, sterile, rhizomatous C4 perennial grass that was collected in Yokahama, Japan, in 1935 by Aksel Olsen. It was taken to Denmark, where it was cultivated and spread throughout Europe and into North America for planting in horticultural settings.") It is a sterile (noninvasive) hybrid of M. sinensis and M. sacchariflorus, and grows to heights of more than 4 m (13 ft) in one growing season (from the third season onwards). In temperate climates such as in Europe, the dry mass yield is 10–40 metric tons per hectare (4.5–17.8 short ton/acre) per year, depending on location. (Note: p. 79, "The majority of the literature reporting dry biomass yield for M. × giganteus originates from European studies. Ceiling peak biomass yields in established stands of M. x giganteus have approached 40 t dry matter (DM) ha^{−1} in some European locations, although it may take 3–5 years to achieve these ceiling yields [84]. Across Europe, harvestable yields of up to 25 t DM ha-1 from established stands of M. × giganteus have been reported in areas between central Germany and southern Italy, while peak yields in central and northern Europe have ranged between 10–25 t DM ha-1, and in excess of 30 t DM ha-1 in southern Europe [3]. A quantitative review of established M. × giganteus stands across Europe reported a mean peak biomass yield of 22 t DM ha-1, averaged across N rates and precipitation levels [1].") Just like Pennisetum purpureum and Saccharum ravennae (which grow to the same height), it is also called "elephant grass".

Miscanthus' ability to grow on marginal land and in relatively cold weather conditions, its rapid CO_{2} absorption, its significant carbon sequestration, and its high yield make it a favorite choice as a biofuel.

Miscanthus is mainly used for heat and power, but can also be used as input for ethanol production (if harvested wet). If harvested dry, it can be burnt directly in biomass boilers, or processed further (pellets, briquettes). It can also be used as a "green" building material, for both wall construction and as general insulation. An experimental house based on Miscanthus straw bales was built in 2017. Miscanthus cropping enhances nutrient cycling in the plant–soil system. In a 2025 research dried stems of Miscanthus giganteus, together with other materials, were used to create a biobased concrete substitute called Xiriton, which offers a low-carbon, eco-friendly material that can support shellfish settlement and salt-marsh restoration.
