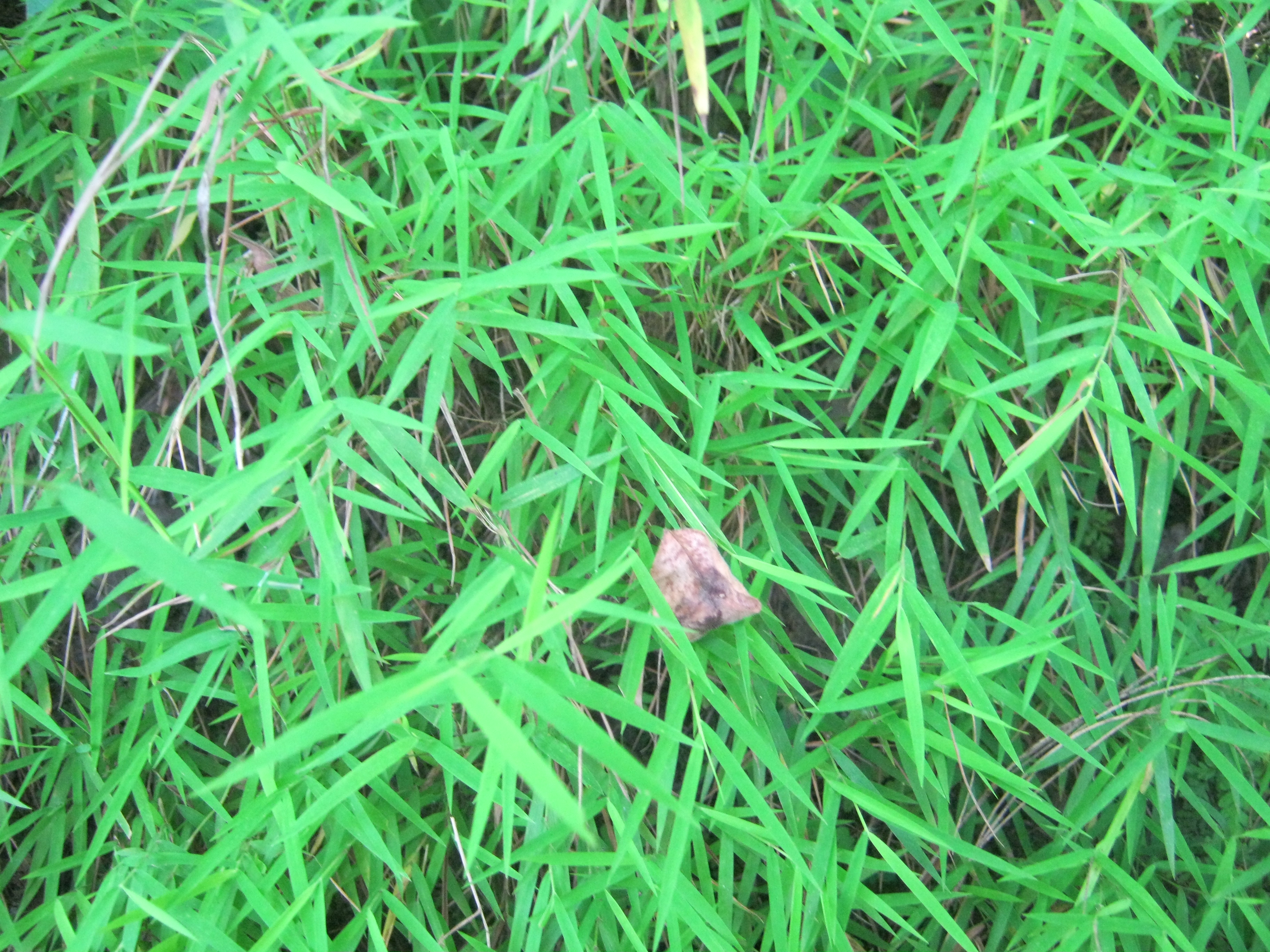
- Pogonatherum paniceum in Nepal

Scientific classification
- Kingdom: Plantae
- Clade: Tracheophytes
- Clade: Angiosperms
- Clade: Monocots
- Clade: Commelinids
- Order: Poales
- Family: Poaceae
- Subfamily: Panicoideae
- Supertribe: Andropogonodae
- Tribe: Andropogoneae
- Subtribe: Germainiinae
- Genus: Pogonatherum; P.Beauv.

Type species
- Pogonatherum saccharoideum (syn of P. paniceum) P.Beauv.

Synonyms
- Homoplitis Trin.; Pogonopsis J.Presl

= Pogonatherum =

Genus of grasses

Pogonatherum is a genus of Asian and oceanic island plants in the grass family.

Species

- Pogonatherum biaristatum S.L.Chen & G.Y.Sheng - Hainan
- Pogonatherum crinitum (Thunb.) Kunth - Indian subcontinent, China, Japan, southeast Asia, Papuasia, Marianas, Madagascar
- Pogonatherum paniceum (Lam.) Hack. - Saudi Arabia, Indian subcontinent, China, southeast Asia, Papuasia
- Pogonatherum rufobarbatum Griff. - Assam

Formerly included

see Arthraxon Eulalia Homozeugos Microstegium Polytrias Pseudopogonatherum

- Pogonatherum amaurum - Polytrias indica
- Pogonatherum aureum - Eulalia aurea
- Pogonatherum contortum - Pseudopogonatherum contortum
- Pogonatherum falconeri - Microstegium falconeri
- Pogonatherum glabratum - Microstegium glabratum
- Pogonatherum huillense - Homozeugos huillense
- Pogonatherum irritans - Pseudopogonatherum irritans
- Pogonatherum molle - Eulalia mollis
- Pogonatherum rufispicum - Microstegium rufispicum
- Pogonatherum tenue - Arthraxon lancifolius
- Pogonatherum tristachyum - Pseudopogonatherum trispicatum
- Pogonatherum villosum - Eulalia villosa
