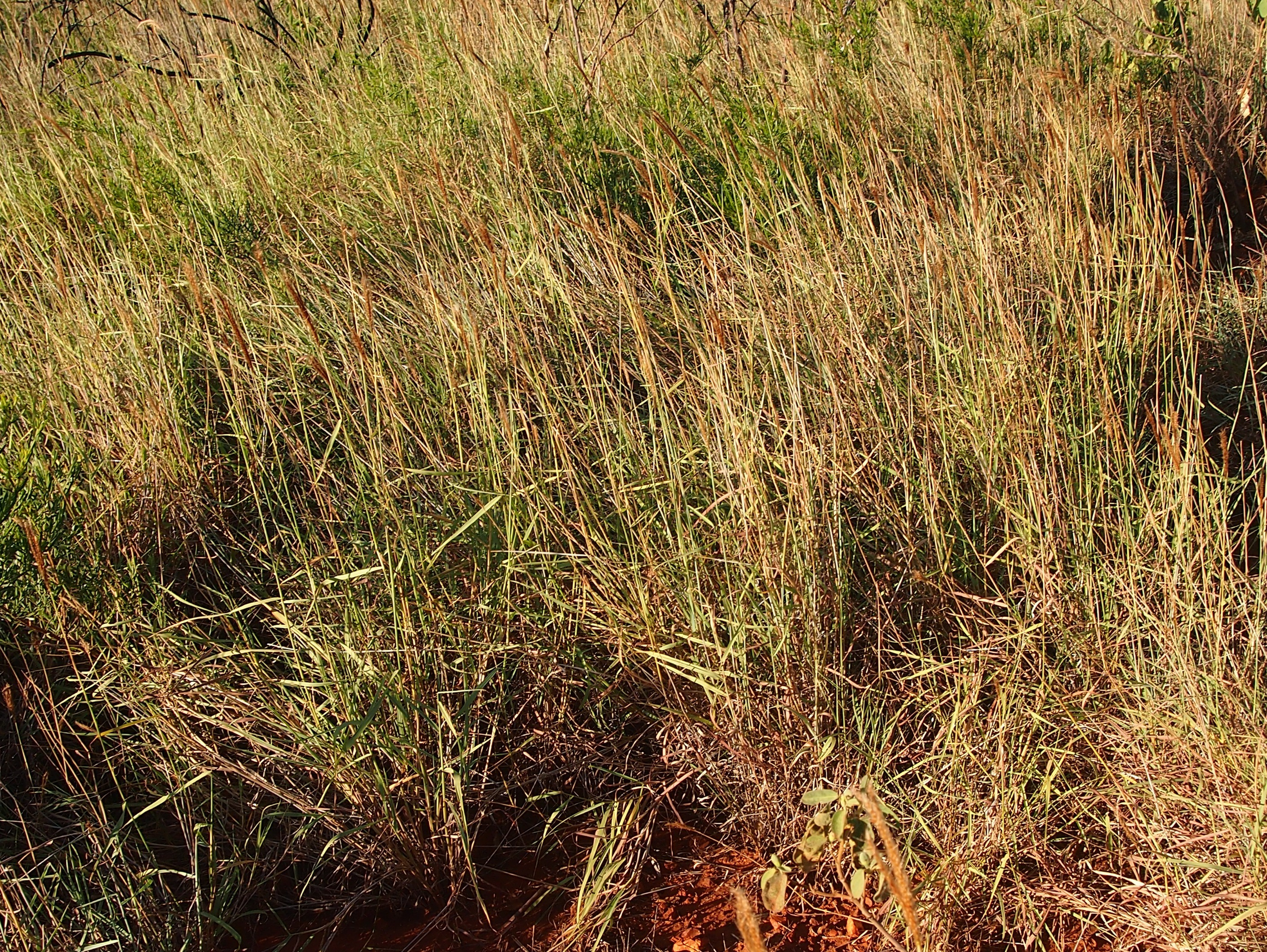
- Eulalia aurea

Scientific classification
- Kingdom: Plantae
- Clade: Embryophytes
- Clade: Tracheophytes
- Clade: Angiosperms
- Clade: Monocots
- Clade: Commelinids
- Order: Poales
- Family: Poaceae
- Subfamily: Panicoideae
- Supertribe: Andropogonodae
- Tribe: Andropogoneae
- Subtribe: Saccharinae
- Genus: Eulalia; Kunth

Type species
- Eulalia aurea (Bory) Kunth

Synonyms
- Pollinia Trin. 1832, illegitimate homonym not Spreng. 1815; Pollinia sect. Eulalia (Kunth) Benth. & Hook. f.; Pollinia subg. Eulalia (Kunth) Hack.

= Eulalia (plant) =

Genus of grasses

Eulalia is a genus of Asian, African, and Australian plants in the grass family.

Eulalia was named after the French botanical artist Eulalie Delile.

As a common name, "eulalia" refers to a grass in a different genus, Miscanthus sinensis.

== Species ==
Sources:

- Eulalia annua – Australia
- Eulalia aurea – silky browntop – Australia, Thailand, Vietnam, Madagascar, Réunion, eastern + southeastern Africa (from Kenya to Mpumalanga)
- Eulalia bicornuta – Thailand, Myanmar
- Eulalia brevifolia – Yunnan
- Eulalia contorta – China, Indian subcontinent, Southeast Asia
- Eulalia fastigiata – Indian subcontinent, New Guinea, Vietnam
- Eulalia fimbriata – Indian subcontinent, Myanmar, Thailand, Vietnam, Java, Lesser Sunda Islands
- Eulalia hirtifolia – Assam, Bhutan, Myanmar
- Eulalia leptostachys – New Guinea
- Eulalia leschenaultiana – Fujian, Guangdong, Jiangxi, Taiwan, Indian subcontinent, Southeast Asia
- Eulalia mackinlayi – Australia
- Eulalia madkotiensis – Uttarakhand
- Eulalia manipurensis – Manipur, Assam, Bhutan, Bangladesh, Myanmar
- Eulalia maritima – Philippines
- Eulalia milsumi – Bukit Lompat Bayan in Selangor
- Eulalia mollis – Tibet, Uttarakhand, Nepal, Sikkim, Bhutan, Assam
- Eulalia monostachya – Cambodia, Thailand, Vietnam
- Eulalia pallens – Myanmar, Assam, Guangxi, Guizhou, Sichuan, Yunnan
- Eulalia phaeothrix – India, Sri Lanka, Myanmar, Thailand, Vietnam, Hainan, Sichuan, Yunnan
- Eulalia polyneura – Ethiopia, Kenya, Tanzania, Zambia, Mozambique
- Eulalia pruinosa – Yunnan
- Eulalia ridleyi – Peninsular Malaysia, Borneo
- Eulalia shrirangii – Maharashtra
- Eulalia siamensis – Myanmar, Thailand, Laos, Yunnan
- Eulalia smitinandiana – Thailand
- Eulalia splendens – Guangxi, Guizhou, Yunnan
- Eulalia staintonii – Uttarakhand, Nepal
- Eulalia tetraseta – Thailand, Cambodia
- Eulalia thwaitesii – India, Sri Lanka
- Eulalia villosa – golden velvet grass – southern Africa, Madagascar, Thailand, Yunnan, India
- Eulalia yunnanensis – Yunnan

== Formerly included species ==
see Andropogon Bothriochloa Microstegium Miscanthus Polytrias Pseudopogonatherum Schizachyrium Spodiopogon

- Eulalia amaura – Polytrias indica
- Eulalia argentea – Pseudopogonatherum trispicatum
- Eulalia bequaertii – Microstegium fasciculatum
- Eulalia birmanica – Pseudopogonatherum speciosum
- Eulalia cantonensis – Microstegium vimineum
- Eulalia capensis – Microstegium nudum
- Eulalia ciliata – Microstegium fasciculatum
- Eulalia clarkei – Bothriochloa kuntzeana
- Eulalia collina – Pseudopogonatherum contortum
- Eulalia concinna – Pseudopogonatherum contortum
- Eulalia cotulifer – Spodiopogon cotulifer
- Eulalia densa – Miscanthus floridulus
- Eulalia dispar – Microstegium dispar
- Eulalia eucnemis – Microstegium eucnemis
- Eulalia filifolia – Pseudopogonatherum filifolium
- Eulalia glabrata – Microstegium glabratum
- Eulalia gracillima – Microstegium glabratum
- Eulalia grata – Microstegium fasciculatum
- Eulalia hydrophila – Andropogon lima
- Eulalia irritans – Pseudopogonatherum irritans
- Eulalia japonica – Miscanthus sinensis
- Eulalia koretrostachys – Pseudopogonatherum contortum
- Eulalia lagopus – Pseudopogonatherum trispicatum
- Eulalia lanipes – Pseudopogonatherum speciosum
- Eulalia mexicana – Bothriochloa barbinodis
- Eulalia monantha – Microstegium fasciculatum
- Eulalia nana – Polytrias indica
- Eulalia nepalensis – Miscanthus nepalensis
- Eulalia nuda – Microstegium nudum
- Eulalia paniculata – Andropogon tenuiberbis
- Eulalia parceciliata – Microstegium fasciculatum
- Eulalia quadrinervis – Pseudopogonatherum quadrinerve
- Eulalia rufispica – Microstegium rufispicum
- Eulalia setifolia – Pseudopogonatherum contortum
- Eulalia simplex – Schizachyrium fragile
- Eulalia speciosa – Pseudopogonatherum speciosum
- Eulalia spectabilis – Microstegium spectabile
- Eulalia tanakae – Pseudopogonatherum speciosum
- Eulalia tenuis – Microstegium tenue
- Eulalia trispicata – Pseudopogonatherum trispicatum
- Eulalia tristachya – Pseudopogonatherum trispicatum
- Eulalia vagans – Microstegium fasciculatum
- Eulalia velutina – Pseudopogonatherum speciosum
- Eulalia viminea – Microstegium vimineum
- Eulalia zebrina – Miscanthus sinensis
