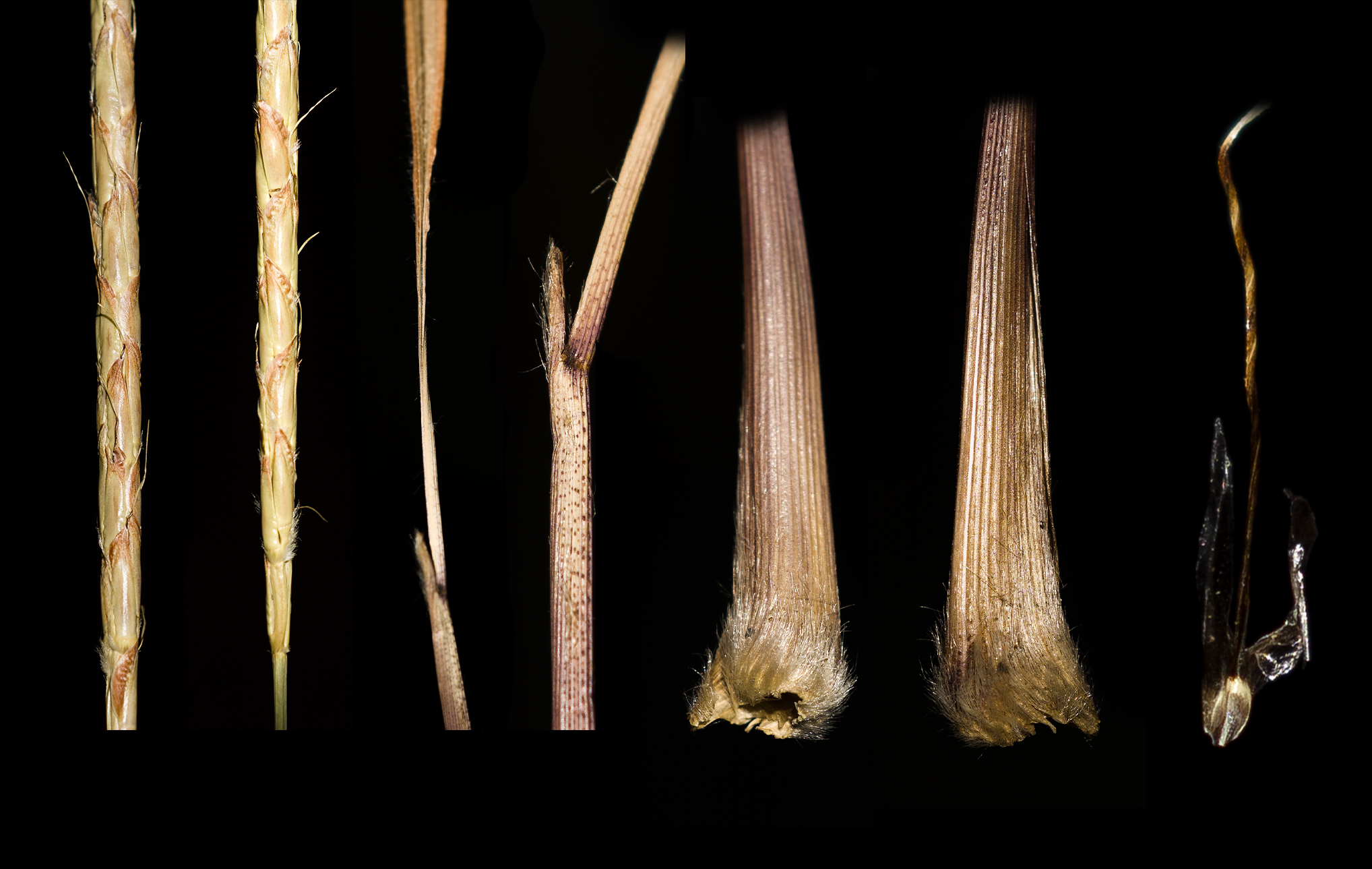
- Ischaemum mistryi Landge & R.D. Shinde

Scientific classification
- Kingdom: Plantae
- Clade: Tracheophytes
- Clade: Angiosperms
- Clade: Monocots
- Clade: Commelinids
- Order: Poales
- Family: Poaceae
- Subfamily: Panicoideae
- Supertribe: Andropogonodae
- Tribe: Andropogoneae
- Subtribe: Ischaeminae
- Genus: Ischaemum; L.

Type species
- Ischaemum muticum L.

Synonyms
- Argopogon Mimeur; Arthrolophis Chiov.; Colladoa Cav.; Digastrium (Hack.) A.Camus; Ischaemopogon Griseb.; Meoschium P.Beauv.; Schoenanthus Adans.

= Ischaemum =

Genus of grasses

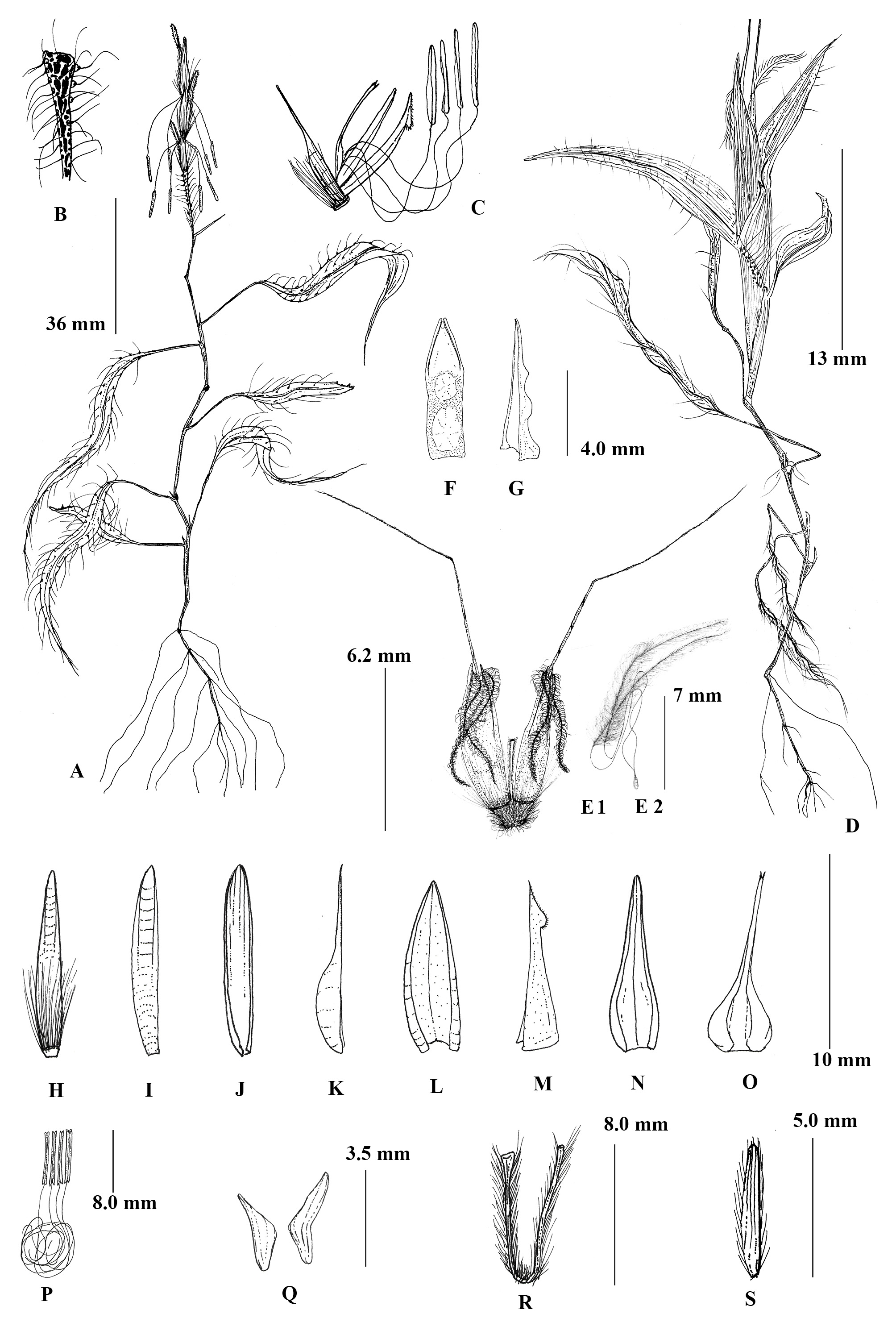
Ischaemum dioecum Landge & R. D. Shinde

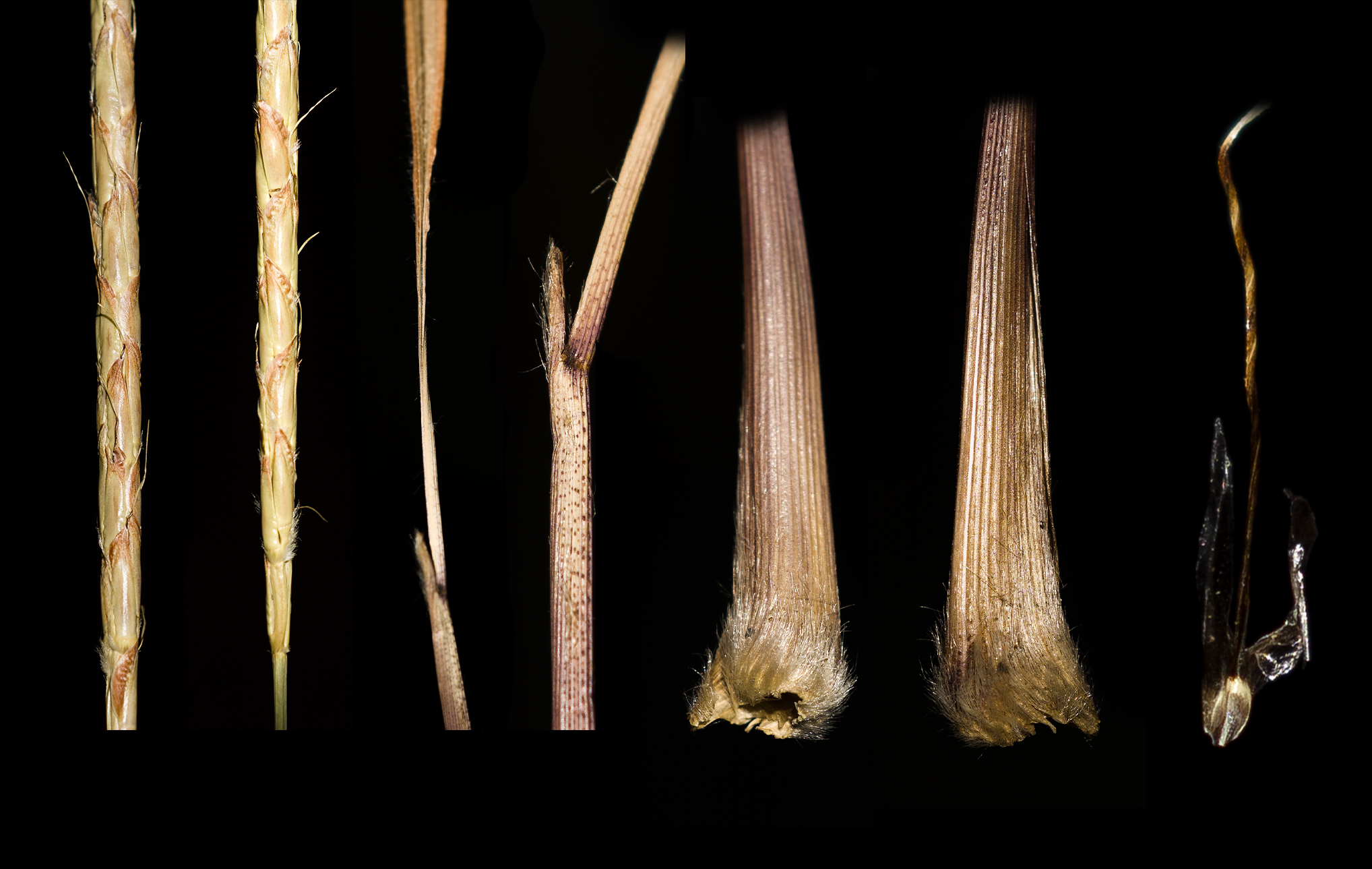
Ischaemum mistryi Landge & R. D. Shinde

Ischaemum is a genus in the tribe Andropogoneae, belonging to the grass family, widespread in tropical and semitropical regions in many countries. Many species are known commonly as murainagrass.

In 2022, Shahid Nawaz (an agrostologist, The Blatter Herbarium (BLAT)) described an unusual species in the genus characterised by its dioecious breeding system, it was named as Ischaemum dioecum Landge & R.D. Shinde. This species is endemic to a couple of locations in Western Ghats of Raigad district, Maharashtra, India. The male and female plants are sexually separate individuals and occupy similar ecological niches. This is the only dioecious species in the tribe Andropogoneae.

== Species ==
- Ischaemum afrum
- Ischaemum agastyamalayanum - (Kerala)
- Ischaemum aghagharii - (Maharashtra)
- Ischaemum albovillosum
- Ischaemum amboliense
- Ischaemum amethystinum
- Ischaemum anthephoroides
- Ischaemum apricum
- Ischaemum arenosum
- Ischaemum aristatum
- Ischaemum aureum
- Ischaemum australe
- Ischaemum barbatum
- Ischaemum beccarii
- Ischaemum bolei - (Maharashtra)
- Ischaemum bombaiense - (North India)
- Ischaemum burmanicum - (South India, Myanmar)
- Ischaemum byrone - Hilo murainagrass
- Ischaemum cannanorense - (Kerala)
- Ischaemum celebicum
- Ischaemum ciliare - batiki bluegrass
- Ischaemum commutatum - (India, Sri lanka)
- Ischaemum copeanum - (Kerala)
- Ischaemum dalzellii - (South India, Sri Lanka)
- Ischaemum decumbens
- Ischaemum digitatum
- Ischaemum dioecum- Shahid's Ischaemum (Maharashtra)
- Ischaemum diplopogon - (North India)
- Ischaemum eberhardtii
- Ischaemum elimalayanum - (South India)
- Ischaemum fieldingianum
- Ischaemum fischeri - (South India)
- Ischaemum flumineum
- Ischaemum fluviatile
- Ischaemum fragile
- Ischaemum glabriglaucum - (Kerala)
- Ischaemum glaucescens
- Ischaemum guianense
- Ischaemum hansenii
- Ischaemum heterotrichum
- Ischaemum hubbardii
- Ischaemum huegelii
- Ischaemum impressum
- Ischaemum janarthanamii
- Ischaemum jayachandranii - (Kerala)
- Ischaemum kingii
- Ischaemum koenigii - (Goa)
- Ischaemum koleostachys
- Ischaemum lanatum - (Kerala)
- Ischaemum latifolium
- Ischaemum lisboae
- Ischaemum longisetum
- Ischaemum magnum
- Ischaemum malabaricum - (Kerala)
- Ischaemum mangaluricum - (South India)
- Ischaemum merrillii
- Ischaemum minus
- Ischaemum mistryi - Mistry's Ischaemum (Maharashtra)
- Ischaemum molle
- Ischaemum murinum
- Ischaemum muticum - seashore centipede grass, drought grass
- Ischaemum nairii - (Kerala)
- Ischaemum nativitatis - Christmas Island duck-beak
- Ischaemum pappinisseriense - (Kerala)
- Ischaemum philippinense
- Ischaemum polystachyum - paddle grass
- Ischaemum pubescens
- Ischaemum pushpangadanii - (Kerala)
- Ischaemum quilonense - (Kerala)
- Ischaemum rangacharianum- (South India)
- Ischaemum raui -(Kerala)
- Ischaemum ritchiei
- Ischaemum roseotomentosum
- Ischaemum rugosum - ribbed murainagrass
- Ischaemum santapaui - (Maharashtra)
- Ischaemum sayajiraoi - (Gujarath)
- Ischaemum semisagittatum
- Ischaemum setaceum
- Ischaemum sreenarayanii
- Ischaemum sunilii - (Kerala)
- Ischaemum tenuifolium
- Ischaemum thomsonianum
- Ischaemum timorense - stalkleaf murainagrass, lucuntu grass
- Ischaemum travancorense - (South India)
- Ischaemum triticeum
- Ischaemum tropicum
- Ischaemum tumidum
- Ischaemum veldkampii
- Ischaemum yadavii - (Goa)

== Formerly included ==
numerous species now regarded as better suited to other genera: Andropogon, Andropterum, Apocopis, Arundinella, Bothriochloa, Coelorachis, Crypsis, Echinochloa, Eremochloa, Eulaliopsis, Kerriochloa, Lasiurus, Manisuris, Microstegium, Phacelurus, Pogonatherum, Polytrias, Rhytachne, Rottboellia, Sehima, Stenotaphrum, Thuarea, Triplopogon, Tripsacum, Vossia

== See also ==
- Tribe Andropogoneae
- List of Poaceae genera
