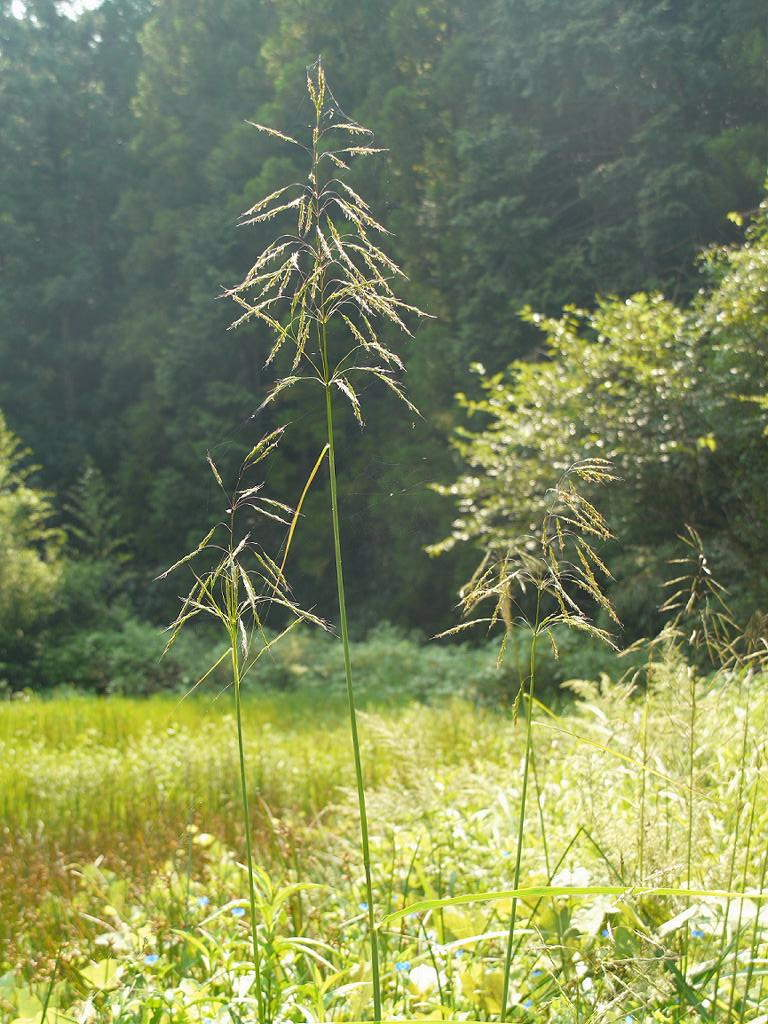
- Spodiopogon cotulifer

Scientific classification
- Kingdom: Plantae
- Clade: Tracheophytes
- Clade: Angiosperms
- Clade: Monocots
- Clade: Commelinids
- Order: Poales
- Family: Poaceae
- Subfamily: Panicoideae
- Supertribe: Andropogonodae
- Tribe: Andropogoneae
- Subtribe: Andropogoninae
- Genus: Spodiopogon; Trin.

Type species
- Spodiopogon sibiricus Trin.

Synonyms
- Eccoilopus Steud.

= Spodiopogon =

Genus of grasses

Spodiopogon is a genus of Asian plants in the grass family.

One species, Spodiopogon formosanus, is grown as a cultivated millet exclusively in Taiwan.

== Species ==
Species

- Spodiopogon aristatus - Gujarat
- Spodiopogon bambusoides - Guangxi, Guizhou
- Spodiopogon cotulifer - Kashmir, Assam, Meghalaya, Nagaland, China incl Taiwan, Korea, Japan incl Ryukyu Islands
- Spodiopogon depauperatus - Japan
- Spodiopogon dubius - Tibet, Nepal, Uttarakhand
- Spodiopogon duclouxii - Sichuan, Yunnan
- Spodiopogon formosanus - Taiwan
- Spodiopogon jainii - India, Myanmar
- Spodiopogon lacei - Bhutan, Assam, Myanmar, Thailand
- Spodiopogon pogonanthus - Iran, Iraq, Turkey, Syria, Lebanon, Palestine, Israel
- Spodiopogon rhizophorus - Maharashtra, Tamil Nadu
- Spodiopogon sagittifolius - Yunnan
- Spodiopogon sibiricus - Russia (Amur, Primorye, Khabarovsk, Irkutsk, Zabaykalsky Krai, Buryatiya), China (Anhui, Gansu, Guangdong, Guizhou, Hainan, Hebei, Heilongjiang, Henan, Hubei, Hunan, Jiangsu, Jiangxi, Jilin, Liaoning, Inner Mongolia, Ningxia, Shaanxi, Shanxi, Shandong, Sichuan, Zhejiang), Korea, Japan, Mongolia
- Spodiopogon tainanensis - Gansu, Jiangsu, Sichuan, Taiwan, Tibet, Yunnan
- Spodiopogon velutinus - Peninsular Malaysia
- Spodiopogon yuexiensis - Sichuan

formerly included

- Spodiopogon angustifolius - Eulaliopsis binata
- Spodiopogon arcuatus - Ischaemum polystachyum
- Spodiopogon aureus - Ischaemum aureus
- Spodiopogon beccarii - Saccharum beccarii
- Spodiopogon binatus - Eulaliopsis binata
- Spodiopogon blumii - Ischaemum timorense
- Spodiopogon byronis - Ischaemum byrone
- Spodiopogon chordatus - Ischaemum polystachyum
- Spodiopogon ciliaris - Arthraxon hispidus
- Spodiopogon conjugatus - Ischaemum semisagittatum
- Spodiopogon cuspidatus - Ischaemum timorense
- Spodiopogon foliatus - Saccharum giganteum
- Spodiopogon geniculatus - Ischaemum barbatum
- Spodiopogon hildebrandtii - Saccharum hildebrandtii
- Spodiopogon inaequalivalvis - Ischaemum ciliare
- Spodiopogon involutus - Eulaliopsis binata
- Spodiopogon ischaemoides - Ischaemum minus
- Spodiopogon laniger - Eulaliopsis binata
- Spodiopogon latifolius - Ischaemum latifolium
- Spodiopogon lehmannii - Microstegium petiolare
- Spodiopogon notopogon - Eulaliopsis binata
- Spodiopogon obliquivalvis - Ischaemum ciliare
- Spodiopogon petiolaris - Microstegium petiolare
- Spodiopogon pilosus - Ischaemum afrum
- Spodiopogon rivalis - Ischaemum polystachyum
- Spodiopogon scrobiculatus - Ischaemum ciliare
- Spodiopogon semisagittatus - Ischaemum polystachyum
- Spodiopogon vaginatus - Saccharum giganteum
- Spodiopogon velutinus - Saccharum velutinum
- Spodiopogon villosus - Ischaemum ciliare
- Spodiopogon zeylanicus - Ischaemum ciliare
