= Ischaemum jayachandranii =

Conservation status
- Critically Endangered (IUCN 3.1)

Scientific classification
- Kingdom: Plantae
- Clade: Tracheophytes
- Clade: Angiosperms
- Clade: Monocots
- Clade: Commelinids
- Order: Poales
- Family: Poaceae
- Subfamily: Panicoideae
- Genus: Ischaemum
- Species: I. jayachandranii

Binomial name
- Ischaemum jayachandranii R.Ansari, V.S.Ramach. & Sreek.

Species of grass

Ischaemum jayachandranii is a critically endangered species of perennial in the family Poaceae. It is found growing in marshy areas and in the rice fields of Kannur district in Kerala, India. It was named after Dr. Velukutty Jayachandran Nair, in recognition of his contributions to the grass species of India who also collected the specimen.
