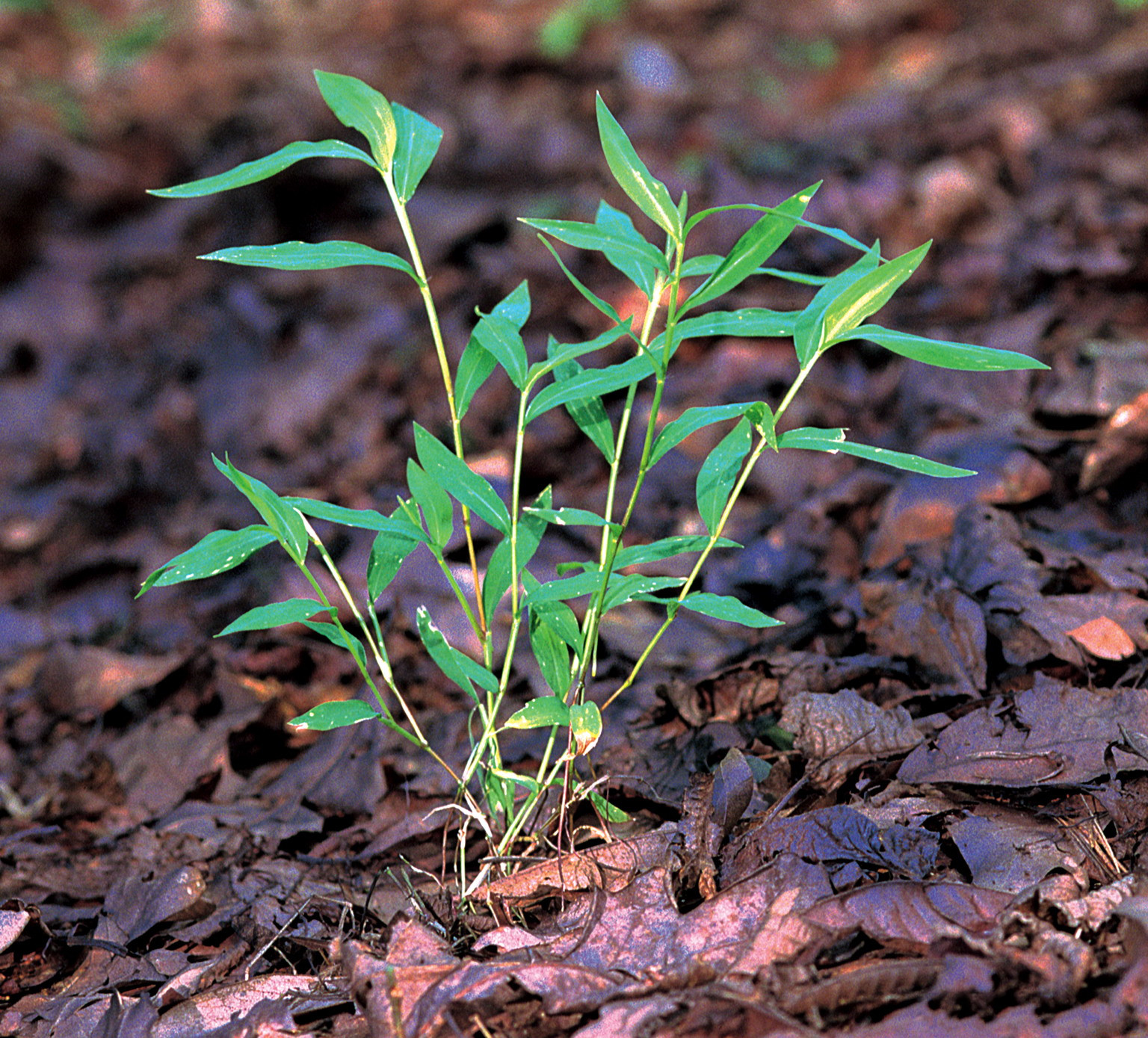

Scientific classification
- Kingdom: Plantae
- Clade: Tracheophytes
- Clade: Angiosperms
- Clade: Monocots
- Clade: Commelinids
- Order: Poales
- Family: Poaceae
- Subfamily: Panicoideae
- Genus: Microstegium
- Species: M. vimineum

Binomial name
- Microstegium vimineum (Trin.) A. Camus

= Microstegium vimineum =

Japanese stiltgrass

Annual grass

Microstegium vimineum, commonly known as Japanese stiltgrass, packing grass, or Nepalese browntop, is an annual grass that is common in a wide variety of habitats and is well adapted to low light levels. It has become an invasive species throughout parts of the world, most notably North America.

== Distribution ==
Microstegium viminium is native to many parts of Asia from Turkey in the west to Japan in the east. In East Asia, it is found in China, Japan, the Russian Far East, North Korea, South Korea, and Taiwan. In Southeast Asia, its native range includes Malaysia, Myanmar, the Philippines, Thailand, Laos, and Vietnam. In South Asia, it occurs in Bhutan, India, and Nepal. In West Asia, particularly in the Caucasus and the Black Sea and Caspian Sea coasts, it can be found in Turkey, Georgia, Iran, and in Sochi in Russia.

The species has also been introduced extensively beyond its native range. In North America, it is established throughout the Midwestern United States, the Southeastern United States, the West South Central United States, the Northeastern United States, and southern Ontario in Canada.

== Description ==
It typically grows to heights between 40 and 100 cm (1.3 and 3.3 ft) and is capable of rooting at each node. The plant flowers in late summer and produces its seeds in the form of a caryopsis shortly thereafter. It is quite similar to and often grows along with the North American grass Leersia virginica, but L. virginica lacks the distinctive silver stripe on the center of the leaf that is present on Japanese stiltgrass and also flowers one to two months earlier.

== Invasiveness ==
The plant was accidentally introduced into the U.S. state of Tennessee around 1919 as a result of being used as a packing material in shipments of porcelain from China. It has spread throughout the Southeastern U.S. and is now found in 26 states. Microstegium vimineum most commonly invades along roads, floodplain and other disturbed areas, but will also invade undisturbed habitats. White-tailed deer, which do not browse the grass, may facilitate spread by browsing on native species and thereby reducing competition for the exotic plant. Invasion of Microstegium can reduce growth and flowering of native species, suppress native plant communities, alter and suppress insect communities, slow plant succession and alter nutrient cycling. Removal of Microstegium can lead to recovery of native plant communities.

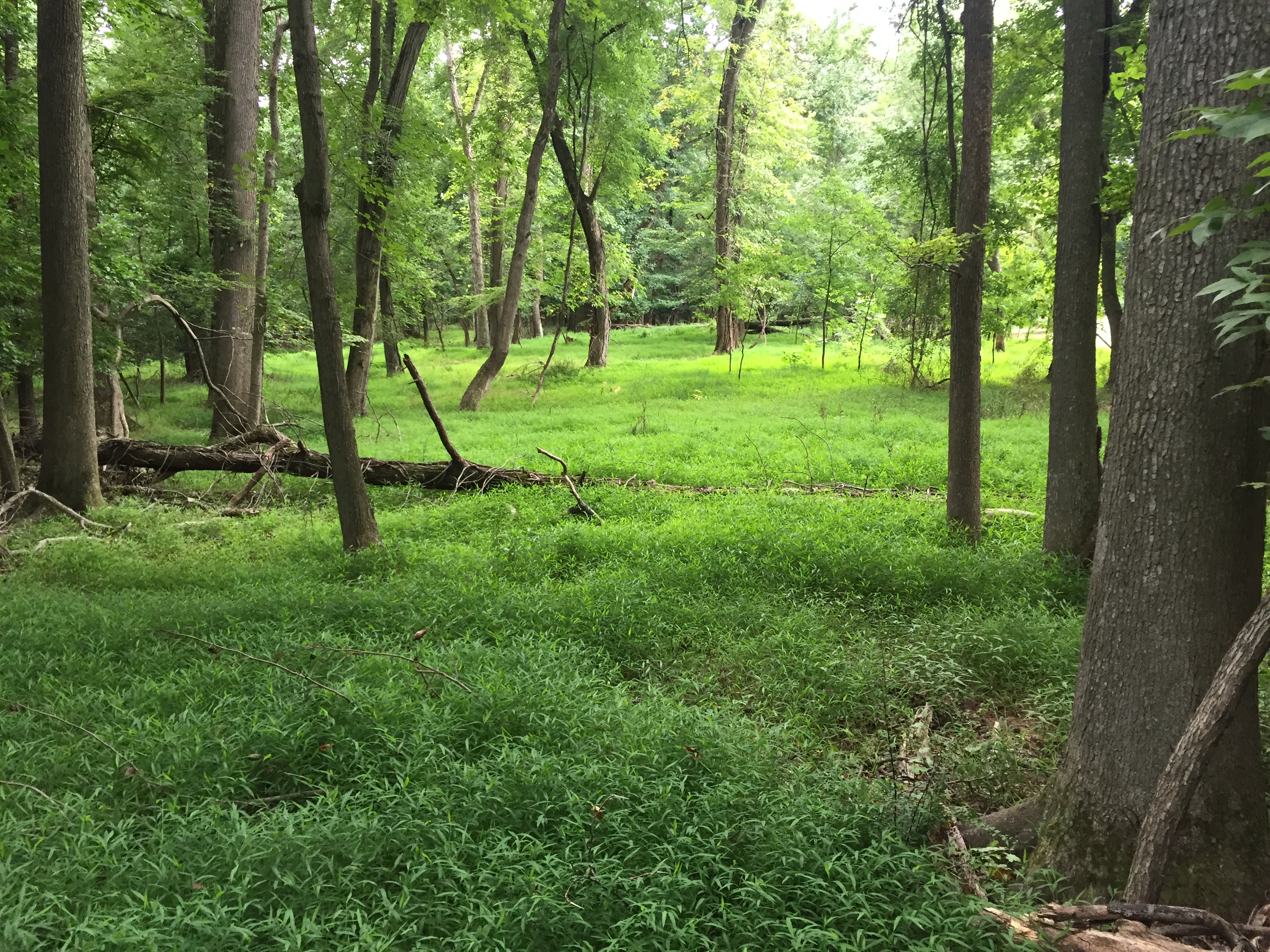
Infestation spreading for acres in partially closed-canopy, mesic forest, Greenbelt, Maryland

As this grass is an annual, in order to control it, mowing must be performed before the plants go to seed.

This plant has been put on the European list of invasive alien species, meaning that it cannot be imported into or traded in the European Union.

== Management ==
It is typically argued that ecological communities with a higher species diversity are able to resist the growth of invasive species. However, the presence of Microstegium Vimineum in recent studies has raised the question of its role as a highly competitive species in these diverse communities. A recent study conducted in North Carolina utilised a two year field experiment to measure the competitive effect and resistance. Results found that the use of diversity-mediated resistance did not result in the deterrence of growth and spread by M. Vimineum due to its strong presence. The results indicate that for the preservation of native species, the invader in this case, M. Vimineum, would have to be removed completely. This has highlights the consequences of invasive species and shows how imperative accessible and safe management options for the overall health of native ecosystems.

As the growth and spread of Microstegium Vimineum increases amongst residential properties there are increasing studies on safe and accessible control methods to protect native plant communities. A study published in 2025 compared the use of glyphosate against vinegar finding glyphosate was effective in removing nearly all M. Vimineum but resulted in less herbaceous plant communities . Vinger was found to only remove around 55% of the M. Vimineum but was able to maintain richness and diversity. On the other hand a study published in 2026 looked into non-herbicide options including shade and sawdust amendments which can suppress M. Vimineum growth whilst also promoting competition for native plant competition. Both studies shows the importance of using safe and accessible management strategies that can be used to control the growth of an invasive species whilst protecting the native plant community.

== Ecological Impact in the U.S. ==
Despite its invasive status in the United States, there are some benefits to stiltgrass. It can serve as a host plant for some native satyr butterflies, such as the Carolina satyr Hermeuptychia sosybius and the endangered Mitchell's satyr Neonympha mitchellii. In the absence of other habitat, stiltgrass is more preferable to have than nothing, providing cover for native amphibians such as wood frogs and toads. Stiltgrass is also unfavorable habitat for ticks due to higher temperature and lower humidity, leading to increased mortality for them. The dead fallen stems of stiltgrass can provide shelter for rodents to the point where aerial predators (owls and hawks) cannot catch them.

White-tailed deer do not eat stiltgrass and help its dominance by eating competing plants. However, stiltgrass can be outcompeted by other aggressive species such as annual ryegrass, Virginia cutgrass, and jewelweed. Stiltgrass can also be controlled by regular fires, thick leaf litter, and succession of taller herbs.

Microstegium Vimineum indirectly benefits spiders and other invertebrates. A study published in 2020 by Ecology and Evolution compared plots invaded by M. Vimineum to plots that were not. The results of the understory arthropod community showed that plots that were invaded had seven times as many individuals along with greater species richness and diversity. The M. Vimineum indirectly benefited spider populations through changing the habitat and structure to increase prey availability. A study conducted by UGA in the Georgia Piedmont region has shown that the resulting increase in lycosid spiders leads to over-predation on toadlets of the American toad (A. americanus) species and other similar foraging toads. Increased spider predation was not observed on ambush predators such as Leopard Frogs (L. sphenocephalus). The invasion of M. Vimineum in Georgia forests alters native species interactions leading to observable cascading impacts.

== Gallery ==
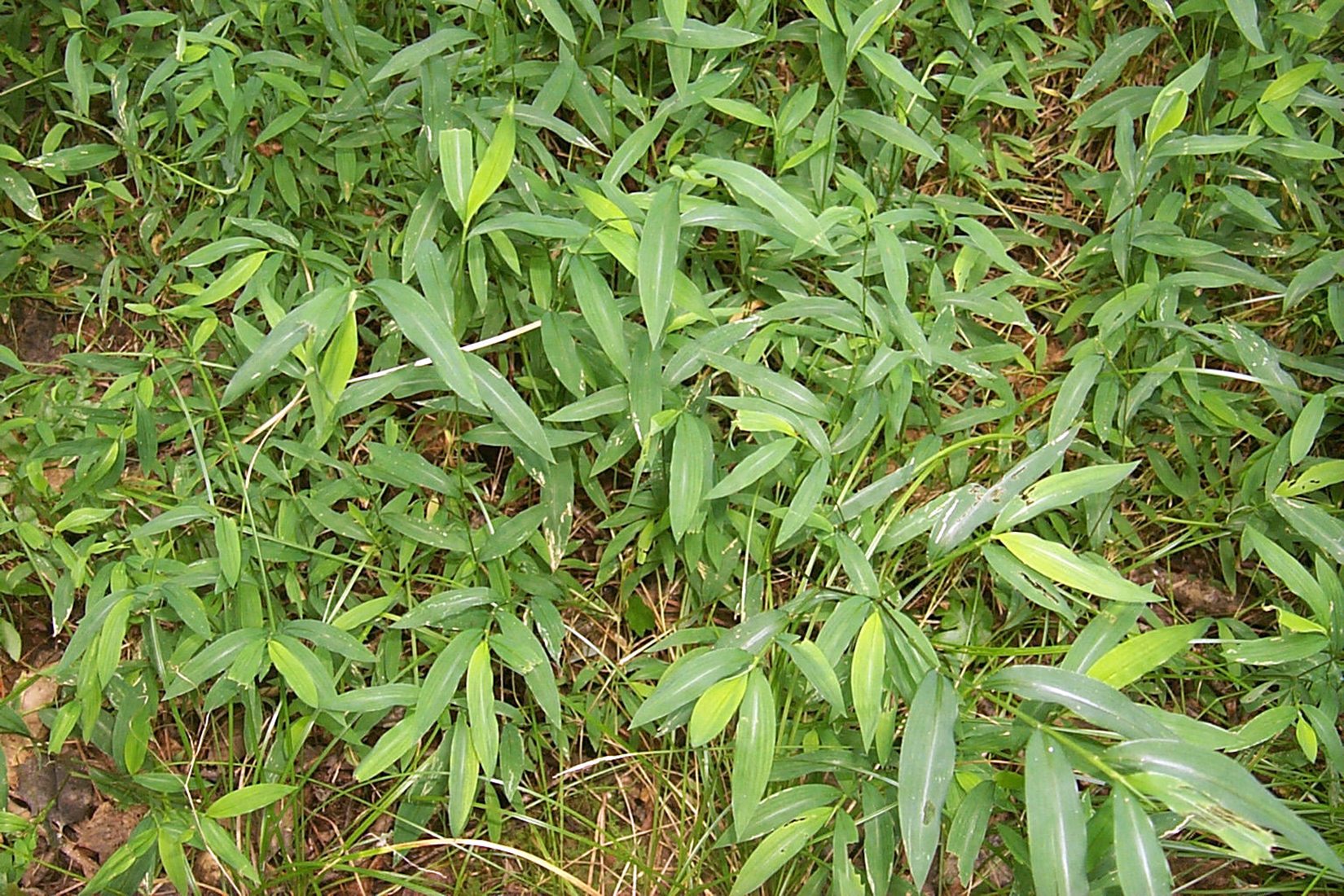
At Congaree National Park, South Carolina, United States

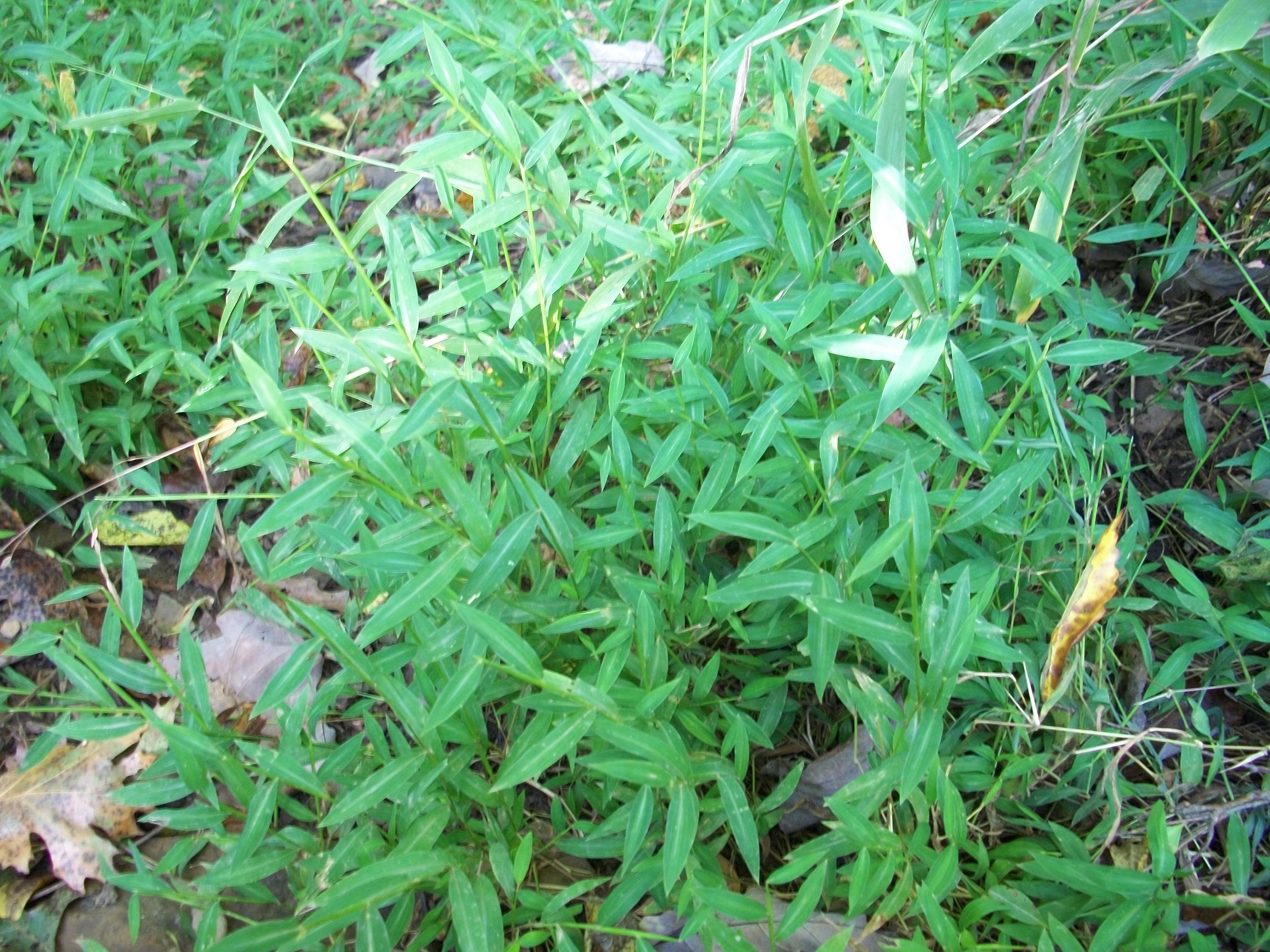
At Devil's Den State Park, Arkansas, USA

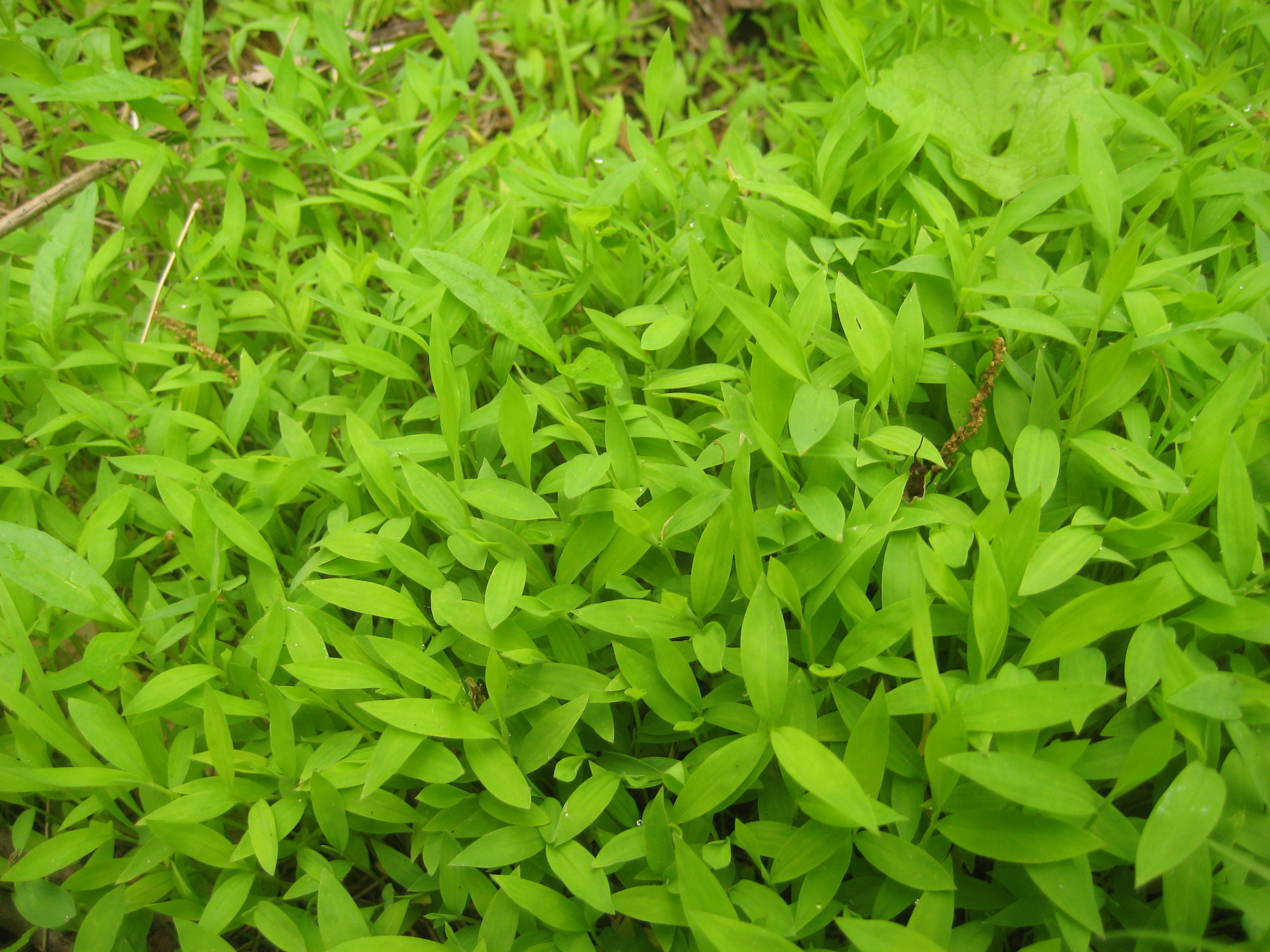
Near a stream in Central New Jersey, USA

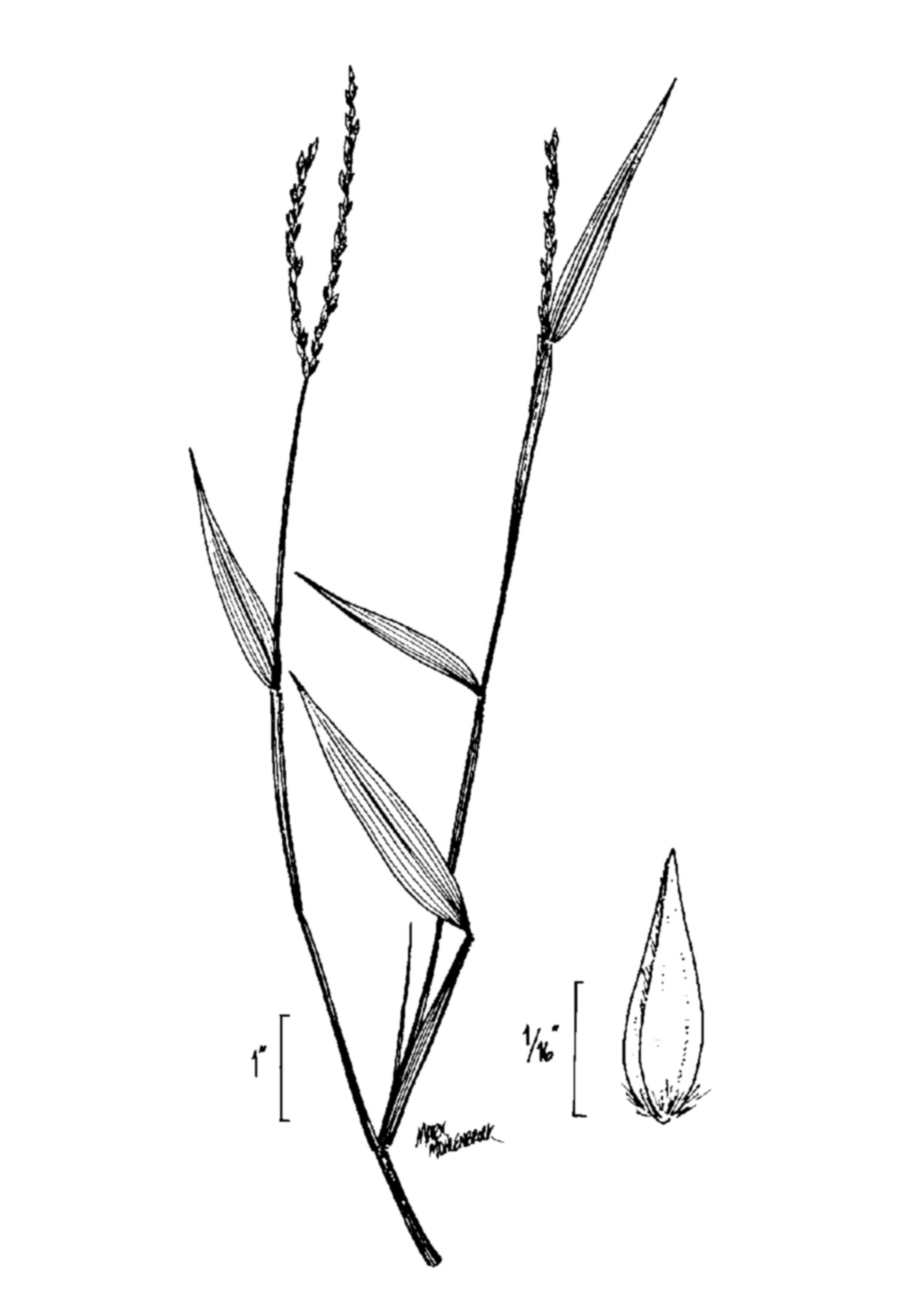
Illustration from Wetland flora: Field office illustrated guide to plant species

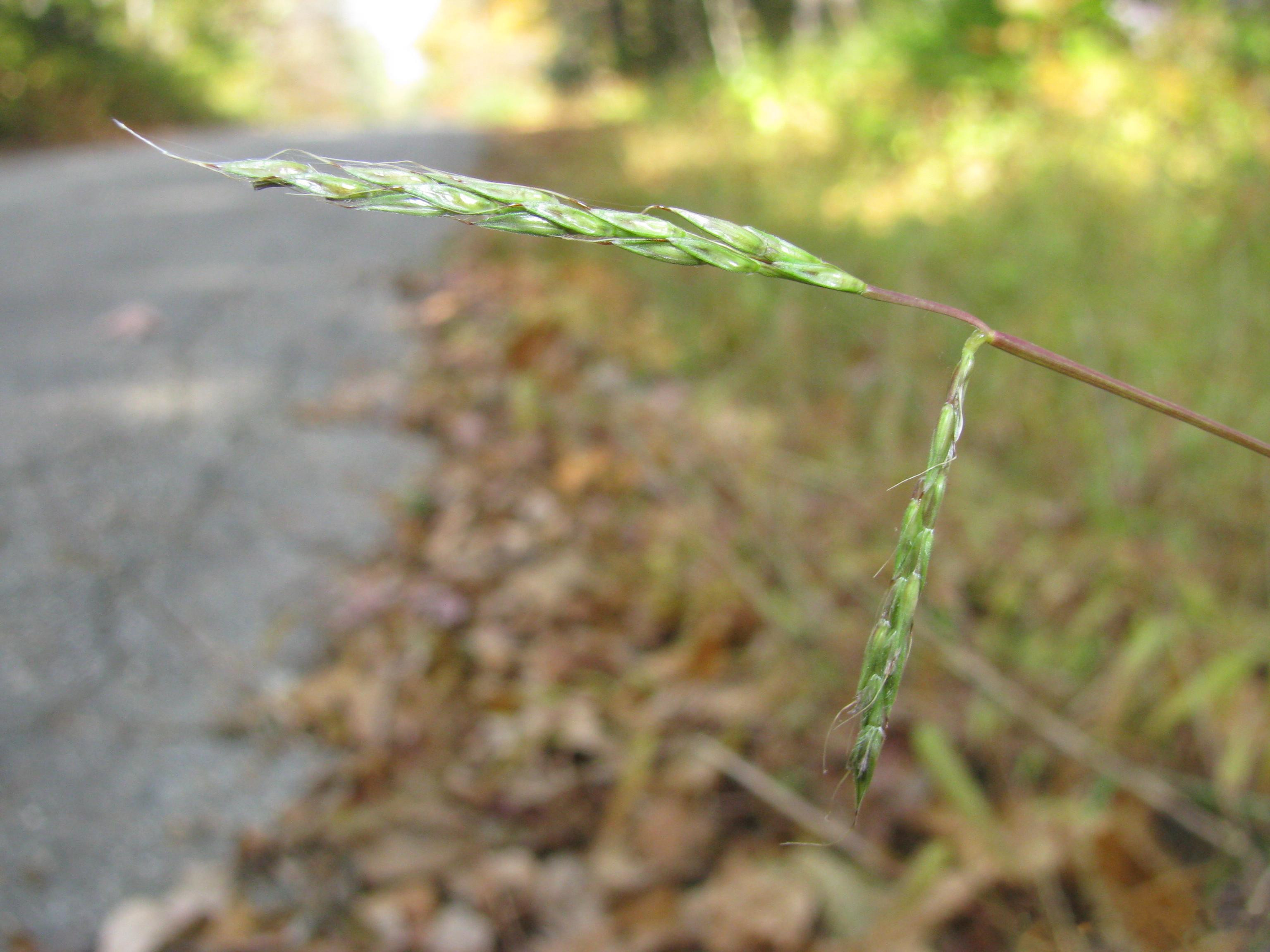
Seeds (caryopses)
