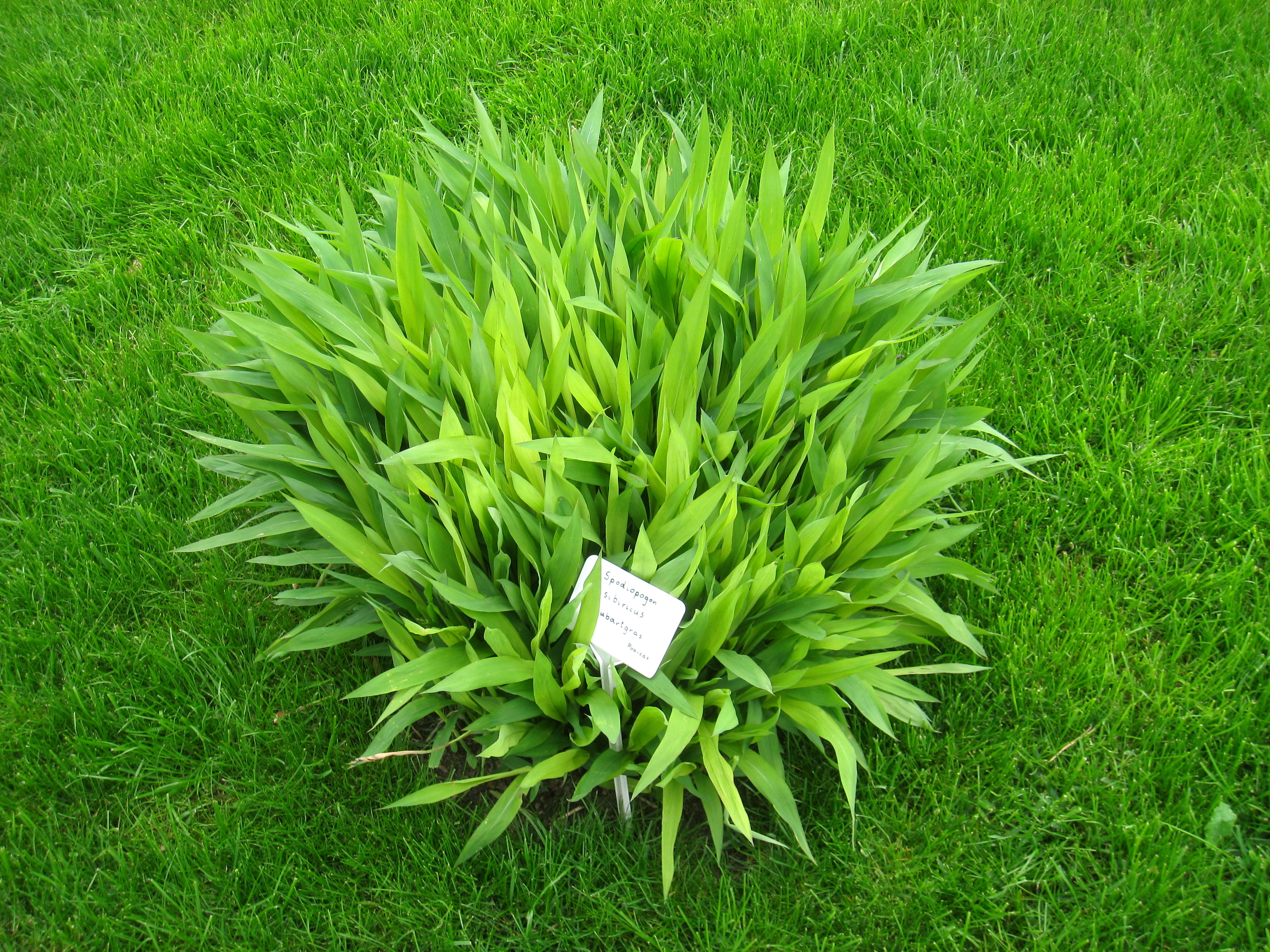

Scientific classification
- Kingdom: Plantae
- Clade: Tracheophytes
- Clade: Angiosperms
- Clade: Monocots
- Clade: Commelinids
- Order: Poales
- Family: Poaceae
- Subfamily: Panicoideae
- Genus: Spodiopogon
- Species: S. sibiricus

Binomial name
- Spodiopogon sibiricus Trin.

= Spodiopogon sibiricus =

Species of grass

Spodiopogon sibiricus is a species of perennial grass in the family Poaceae.

It is native to Siberia, Mongolia, China, Korea, and Japan.

Culms are solitary, erect, 70–200 cm in height, 2–4 mm in diameter, and unbranched.

== Common names ==
- frost grass
- Siberian graybeard
- silverspike
