= Homozeugos conciliatum =

Scientific classification
- Kingdom: Plantae
- Clade: Tracheophytes
- Clade: Angiosperms
- Clade: Monocots
- Clade: Commelinids
- Order: Poales
- Family: Poaceae
- Subfamily: Panicoideae
- Genus: Homozeugos
- Species: H. conciliatum

Binomial name
- Homozeugos conciliatum Guala

Species of grass

Homozeugos conciliatum is a species of grass in the family Poaceae native to Angola. It is known only from a single location in Huambo Province's central highlands at an elevation of about 1,700 m (5,600 ft).

Homozeugos conciliatumis a perennial herb forming clumps, spreading by means of underground rhizomes. Stems can attain a height of up to 100 cm (39 in). It is easily distinguished from the other species in the genus by its short ligules (less than 6 mm (0.24 in) long) and involute leaves.
