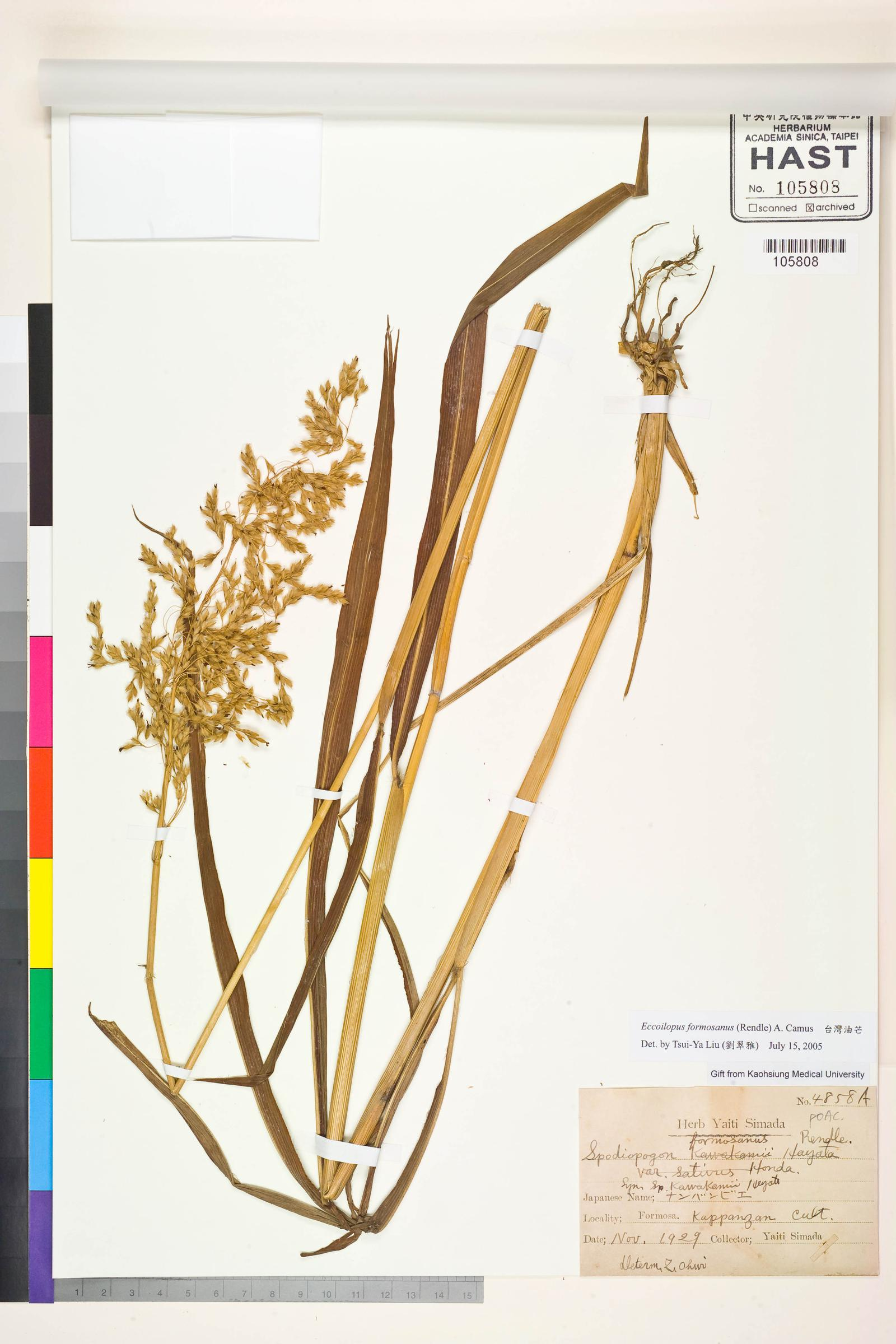

Scientific classification
- Kingdom: Plantae
- Clade: Tracheophytes
- Clade: Angiosperms
- Clade: Monocots
- Clade: Commelinids
- Order: Poales
- Family: Poaceae
- Subfamily: Panicoideae
- Genus: Spodiopogon
- Species: S. formosanus

Binomial name
- Spodiopogon formosanus Rendle

Synonyms
- Eccoilopus formosanus

= Spodiopogon formosanus =

Species of grass

Spodiopogon formosanus or the Taiwan oil millet (Chinese: 臺灣油芒; pinyin: táiwān yóumáng) (syn.: Eccoilopus formosanus) is a species of perennial grass in the family Poaceae. It is endemic to Taiwan. It is traditionally grown as a cereal crop by Taiwanese indigenous peoples.

Its wild progenitor is most likely Spodiopogon cotulifer, which is found in Taiwan and also in mainland China.

For most of the 20th century, the Taiwan oil millet had been misidentified as Echinochloa esculenta (the Japanese barnyard millet or hie 稗) until it was "rediscovered" by Dorian Fuller in the 2000s with the proper identification of specimens as Spodiopogon formosanus.

== Cultivation ==
In the Rukai village of Vedray (霧台 Wutai), the Paiwan village of Masilid, and the Bunun village of Tahun, the Taiwan oil millet is grown alongside other cereal crops such as rice, foxtail millet, sorghum, and Job's tears (and also finger millet and proso millet in Tahun).

The Bunun, Rukai, and Paiwan peoples often sow foxtail millet and Taiwan oil millet simultaneously from winter to early spring. Although foxtail millet is typically harvested during mid-summer, Taiwan oil millet is harvested in late autumn.

== Common names ==
Common names for Spodiopogon formosanus in Formosan languages:

- Amis (?): samuk
- Bunun: diirh; diil
- Tsou: ihalumay, hrome; herome
- Rukai: lhaomai; larumai, irome
- Paiwan: rumay; jumai, lumai, lyumai

Common names from Yuasa (2001):

- Saaroa: naumi
- Kanakanabu: hrome

Most of the lexical forms reconstruct to *Numay.

It is also occasionally referred to as the Formosan beard grass or Taiwan hill millet.
