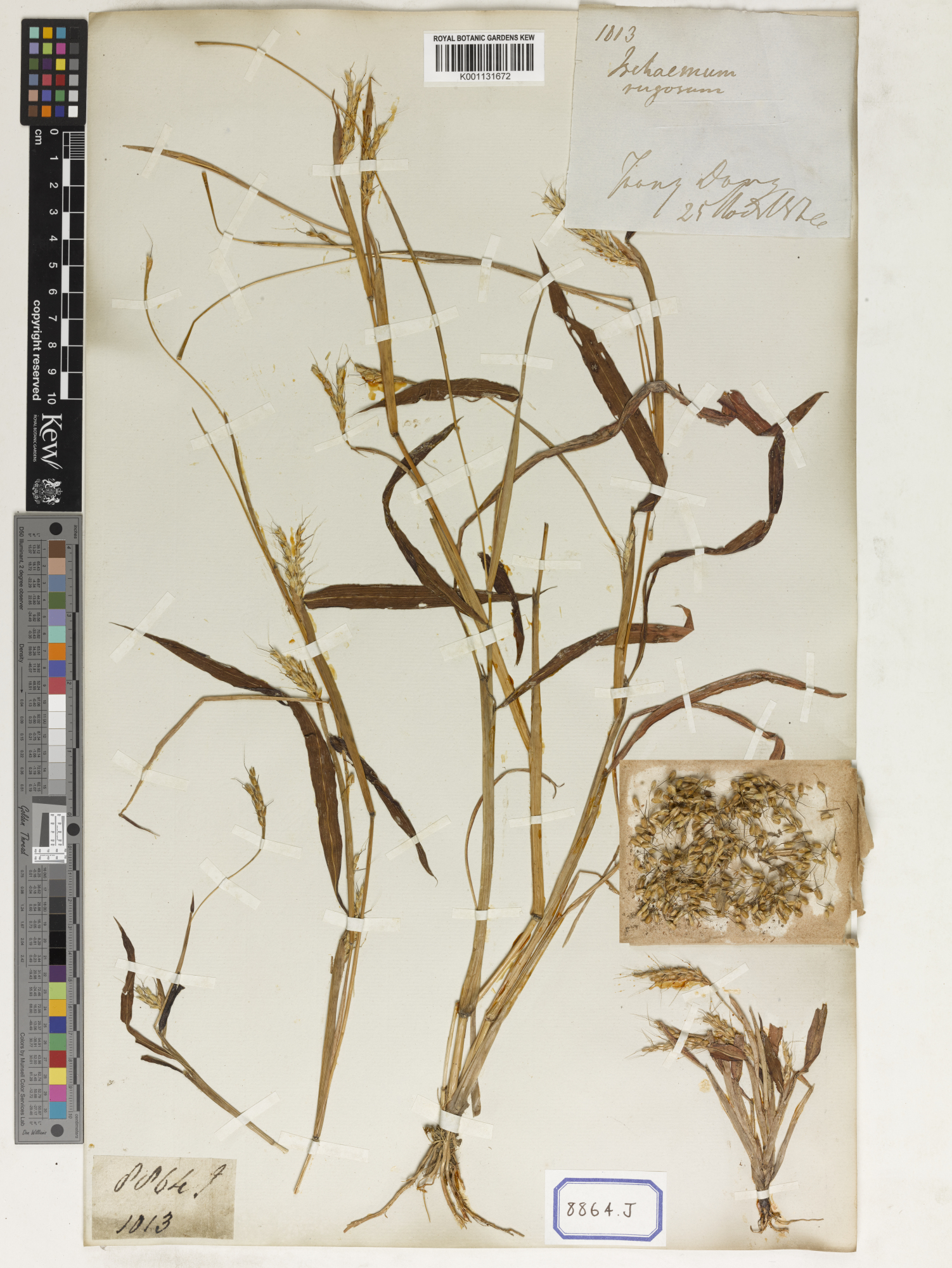

Scientific classification
- Kingdom: Plantae
- Clade: Tracheophytes
- Clade: Angiosperms
- Clade: Monocots
- Clade: Commelinids
- Order: Poales
- Family: Poaceae
- Subfamily: Panicoideae
- Genus: Ischaemum
- Species: I. rugosum

Binomial name
- Ischaemum rugosum Salisb.

= Ischaemum rugosum =

Species of grass

Ischaemum rugosum, also known as saramollagrass, is a flowering plant belonging to the grass family Poaceae in the genus Ischaemum, and is native to tropical and temperate regions of Asia, growing in marshes and other wet habitats. It is a vigorous annual, and is an invasive species in South America and Madagascar. It reaches heights of up to 1 m and is primarily recognized by the ridged surface of its sessile spikelet's lower glume. Despite its historic importance as fodder in Asia, the grass has become a major weed in mid-latitude rice paddies throughout Asia and South America.

== Description ==
Ischaemum rugosum is a resilient annual that inhabits marshes and other wet habitats, growing in loose clumps to heights of 10–100 cm. The species is primarily recognized by the wrinkled texture of the sessile spikelet's lower glume, with 4–7 distinct horizontal ribs. The plant produces brown, ovoid grains 2 mm long.

The culms are wrapped by a papery, loose leaf sheath up to 16 cm long, with bulbous-based hairs at the node base and sheath margin. Sheaths are topped with a membranous ligule 6 mm deep. The linear leaf blades are 5–30 cm long and 3–15 mm wide, gradually tapering down at the base and sometimes resembling a petiole. Blades have a margin of stiff minute hairs, and may either be smooth or covered with thin hairs on the leaf surface.

The inflorescence may be terminal or axillary, and is composed of two racemes, tightly back to back, and typically 3–12 cm long. Spikelets on each raceme are in pairs; one spikelet is fertile and sessile, and the other is sterile and pedicelled.

Sessile spikelets are 4–6 mm long and contain two florets, one sterile and one fertile; the pair lack a rachilla extension between them. The awn of the upper lemma reaches up to 2 cm. Glumes are unalike; the lower glume is ovate with a ridged, convex surface, and the upper is thinner and boat-shaped.

The pedicelled spikelets may be highly reduced or well-developed, and are at least as long as the sessile spikelets, or shorter (2–6 mm long). The pedicel is typically 1 mm long and stout, and spikelet's lemmas are usually empty and awnless. The glumes are papery, and ovate to pointed with a blunt apex.

== Etymology ==
The genus Ischaemum L. takes its name from the Latin ischaemon (Greek ischo "to restrain" and haima "blood"), as recorded by Pliny the Elder to describe an herb used to stop bleeding. As circumscribed by Linnaeus, the genus contained some species whose seeds had been known to have styptic properties, and so the name was inherited. The specific epithet rugosum authored by Salisbury is derived from the Latin rugosus "wrinkled", and refers to the wrinkled lower glumes on the sessile spikelets.

== Habitat and ecology ==
The species grows in water, wet grasslands, moist river banks, and drainage ditches, and is important to grazing animals in the regions to which it is native. Its vigorous nature gives it a high invasive potential, and it is a well-known agricultural weed throughout the moist tropics. Within the optimum temperature range of germination from 20–30 °C, a 2015 study observed a 97.5% germination rate in lab conditions, which attests to its competitiveness as an invasive species. However, germination is restricted to sufficiently moist soil, and completely inhibited in darkness, which may inform future directions in weed management.

== Distribution ==
Ischaemum rugosum occupies a wide native distribution in tropical and temperate regions of Asia, Africa, and Oceania. However, it has extended its range as an invasive species within the mid-latitudes of Latin America.

== Taxonomy and systematics ==
Taxonomists recognize five sections within the genus Ischaemum, placing Ischaemum rugosum within the section Aristata (recognized by a rugose lower glume and awnless upper glume on the sessile spikelet). The species was first described formally by the British botanist Richard Anthony Salisbury in 1791, in his publication Icones Stirpium Rariorum Descriptionibus Illustratae. Symptomatic of its extensive distribution, the species has accumulated 20 synonyms across 7 genera; however, as presently recognized, the species adopts Salisbury's original classification. Since the species inhabits such a wide native range from tropical Africa to southern Asia, it goes by a myriad of regional names as well (e.g. fovo in Sierra Leone, amarkarh in parts of India, môm u in Vietnam, and ka-gyi-the-myet in Myanmar).

Ischaemum rugosum belongs to Poaceae (Graminae), an economically important group and the fifth largest Angiosperm family (with 11,506 species). The genus Ischaemum has undergone several iterations of supergeneric classification within the tribe Andropogoneae, in the subfamily Panicoideae; these disagreements owe largely to the high degree of variation over a morphological continuum in Andropogoneae, which has made it a challenge to circumscribe monophyletic subdivisions. Early molecular phylogenetic revisions of the Andropogoneae suggested its major lineages arose from a rapid evolutionary radiation, in which such case the circumscription of well-supported subtribes would be difficult, if not arbitrary. However, the most recent synthesis of morphological and molecular data presents a phylogenetic classification that recognizes the genus Ischaemum within subfamily Panicoideae, supertribe Andropogonodae, tribe Andropogoneae, subtribe Ischaeminae. Several previously recognized varieties have been reduced to synonymy.

== In agriculture ==
Besides the grain occasionally being used as food, the species has historically been economically important as forage for horses and cattle, and harvested as hay. However, its greatest economic impact has been as a noxious weed in vegetable and rice fields in countries including India, Thailand, Ghana, Brazil, Venezuela, and Malaysia. A study in India reported that an outbreak of Ischaemum rugosum can reduce a rice paddy yield by up to 69.4%. One challenge is that the young shoots of the plant resemble the rice growing in the fields. But a greater concern is that over the past several decades, it has evolved resistance to several commonly used herbicides. Presently, the most effective weed management strategies recognized are cultural methods, such as mulching with rice residue and shallow tillage.
