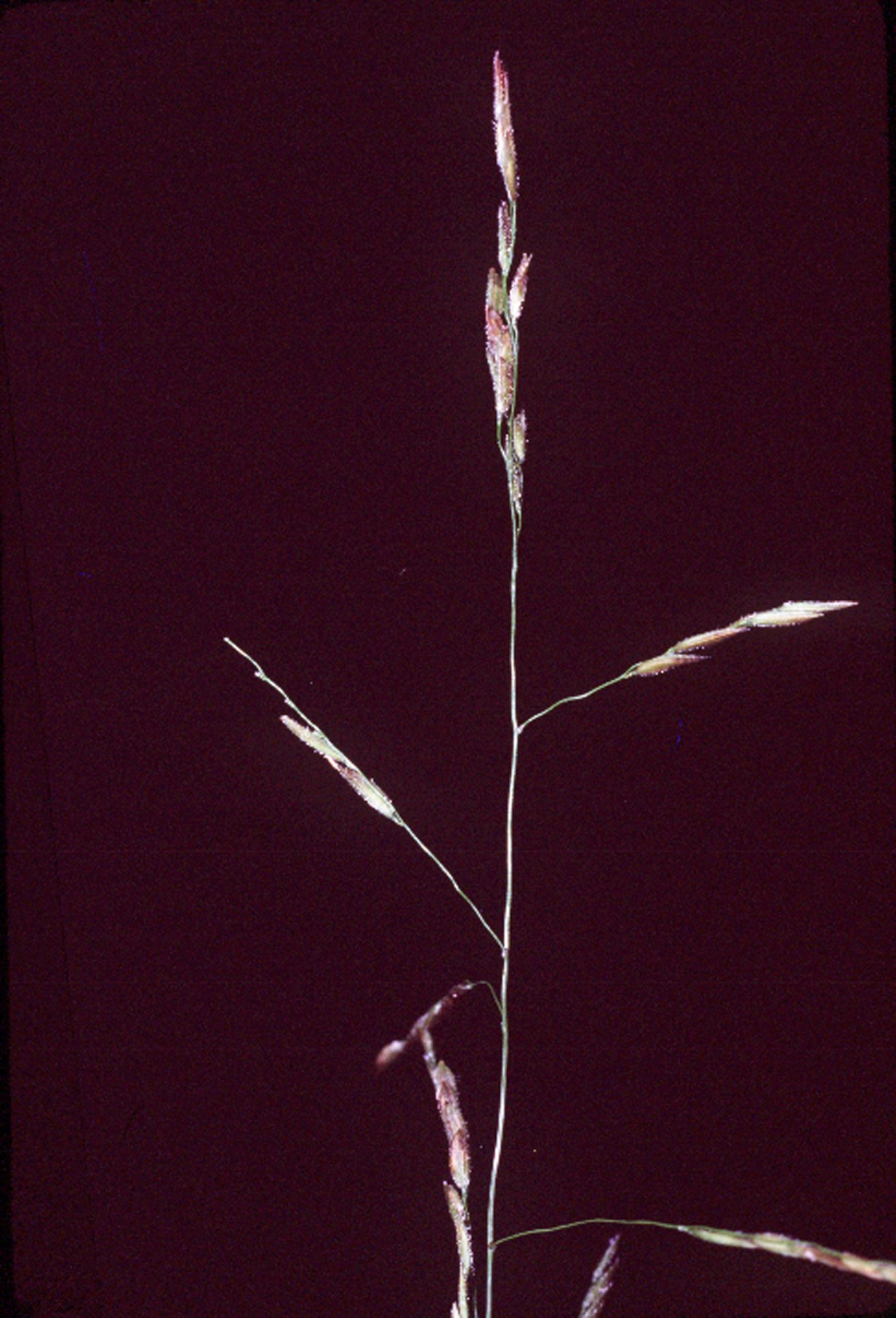

Scientific classification
- Kingdom: Plantae
- Clade: Tracheophytes
- Clade: Angiosperms
- Clade: Monocots
- Clade: Commelinids
- Order: Poales
- Family: Poaceae
- Genus: Leersia
- Species: L. virginica

Binomial name
- Leersia virginica Willd.

= Leersia virginica =

Species of flowering plant

Leersia virginica, commonly known as whitegrass, white cutgrass, or Virginian cutgrass, is a perennial grass that is native to eastern North America, typically found in partially shaded low-lying wet areas. It has been observed in habitats such as along streambanks, in swamps, and in floodplain forests.

Its blooming period occurs from mid-summer to early fall. Whitegrass can be distinguished from rice cutgrass (Leersia oryzoides) by its smoother leaf sheaths, flowering heads with solitary lower branches in the flowering heads, smaller and more strongly overlapping spikelets, and short rhizomes with overlapping scales. Rice cutgrass, in contrast, has leaf sheaths round enough to cause painful scratches, flowering heads with two or more branches at the lowermost nodes, larger and barely overlapping spikelets, and more elongated rhizomes with the scales usually not overlapping.
