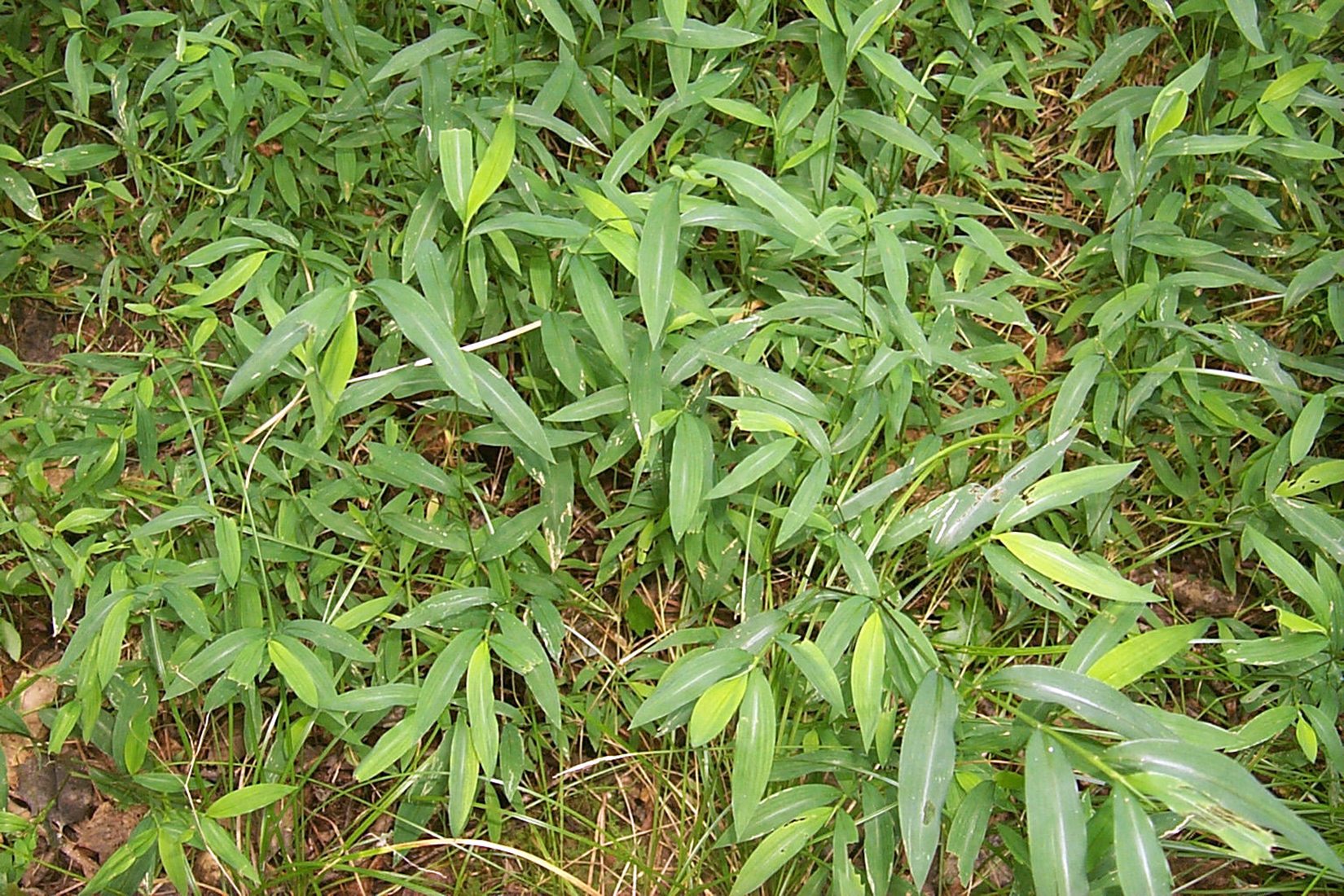
- Microstegium vimineum

Scientific classification
- Kingdom: Plantae
- Clade: Tracheophytes
- Clade: Angiosperms
- Clade: Monocots
- Clade: Commelinids
- Order: Poales
- Family: Poaceae
- Subfamily: Panicoideae
- Supertribe: Andropogonodae
- Tribe: Andropogoneae
- Genus: Microstegium; Nees 1836 not Lindb. 1865 (moss in Funariaceae)

Type species
- Microstegium willdenowianum (syn of M. vimineum) Nees ex Steud.

Synonyms
- Eulalia sect. Microstegium ( Nees ) Kuntze; Dactylus Burm.f. 1768 not Forssk. 1775 nor Asch. 1864; Leptatherum Nees; Psilopogon Hochst.; Nemastachys Steud.; Coelarthron Hook.f.; Ischnochloa Hook.f.; Polliniopsis Hayata

= Microstegium =

Genus of grasses

Microstegium is a genus of African, Asian, and Pacific Island plants in the sorghum tribe within the grass family. Browntop is a common name.

Species

- Microstegium batangense - Sichuan
- Microstegium biaristatum - East + Southeast Asia, Indian Subcontinent, New Guinea
- Microstegium borianum - Meghalaya
- Microstegium brandisii - Taiwan, Myanmar, Java, Bali, Flores, Sulawesi
- Microstegium butuoense - Sichuan
- Microstegium delicatulum - Yunnan, Assam, Myanmar, Thailand
- Microstegium dispar - Java, Bali, Flores
- Microstegium eucnemis - India, Nepal, Southeast Asia, New Guinea
- Microstegium falconeri - Himalayas
- Microstegium fasciculatum - China, Southeast Asia, Indian Subcontinent, New Guinea, tropical Africa
- Microstegium fauriei - Taiwan
- Microstegium geniculatum - China, Southeast Asia
- Microstegium glabratum - Philippines, Indonesia, Hainan, Papuasia, Micronesia, Ryukyu Islands, Society Islands
- Microstegium japonicum - China, Japan, Korea
- Microstegium lanceolatum - Yunnan
- Microstegium monoracemum - Guangdong
- Microstegium nudum - China, Japan, Southeast Asia, Indian Subcontinent, New Guinea, tropical + southern Africa
- Microstegium petiolare - Yunnan, Himalayas, Myanmar, Thailand
- Microstegium rufispicum - Java
- Microstegium somae - Anhui, Fujian, Nansei-shoto, Taiwan
- Microstegium spectabile - Papuasia, Southeast Asia, Hainan, Taiwan, Hong Kong
- Microstegium stapfii - Myanmar
- Microstegium steenisii - Java
- Microstegium tenue - Taiwan, Luzon, Kosrae
- Microstegium vimineum - Primorye, China, Japan, Korea, Himalayas, Southeast Asia; invasive in North America and in parts of Africa

formerly included

see Ischaemum Schizachyrium

- Microstegium pseudeulalia - Schizachyrium pseudeulalia
- Microstegium rupestre - Ischaemum polystachyum
