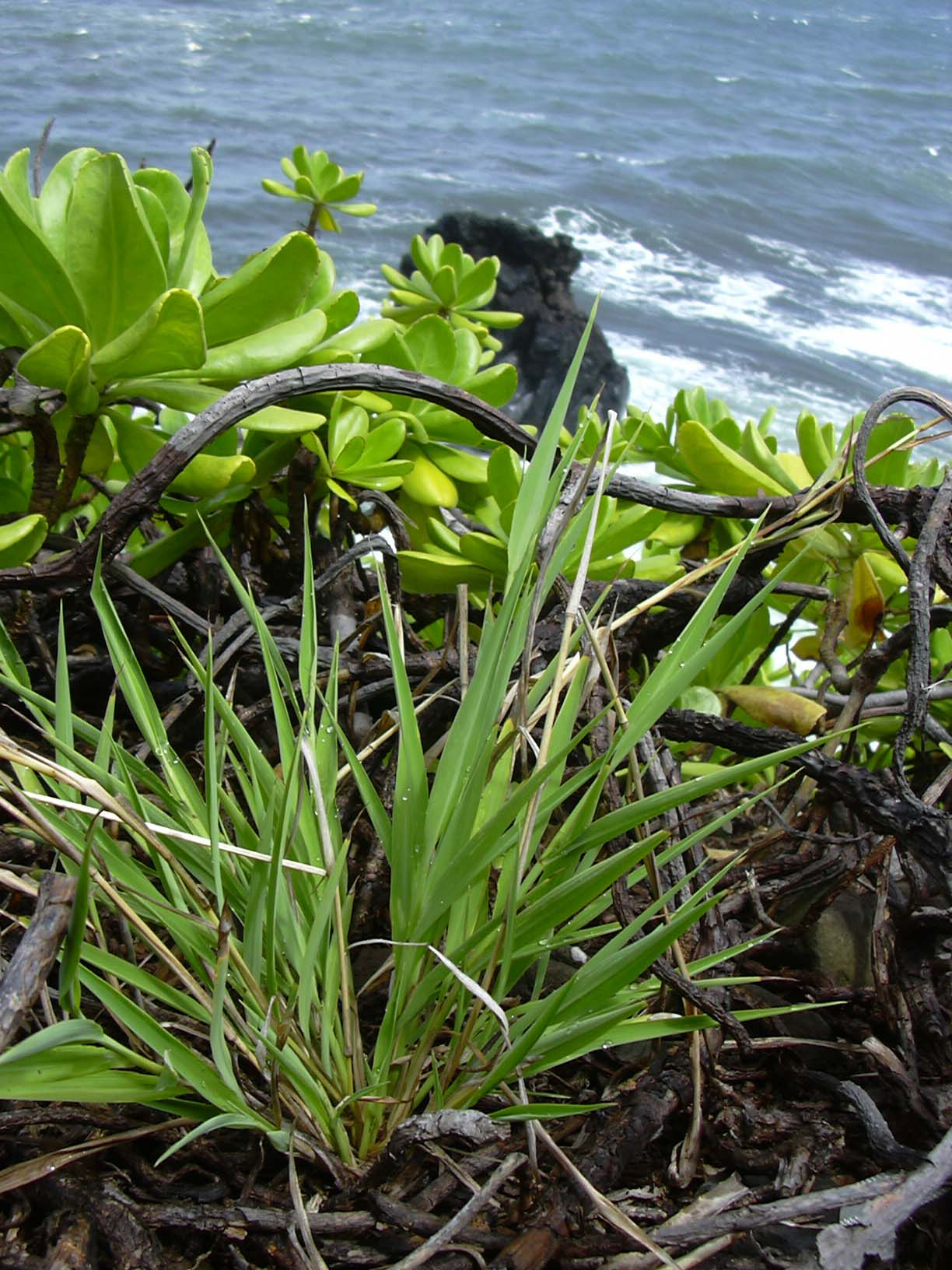
- In Haleakalā National Park, Maui

Conservation status
- Vulnerable (IUCN 3.1)

- Imperiled (NatureServe)

Scientific classification
- Kingdom: Plantae
- Clade: Embryophytes
- Clade: Tracheophytes
- Clade: Angiosperms
- Clade: Monocots
- Clade: Commelinids
- Order: Poales
- Family: Poaceae
- Subfamily: Panicoideae
- Genus: Ischaemum
- Species: I. byrone

Binomial name
- Ischaemum byrone (Trin.) Hitchc. (1922)

Synonyms
- Andropogon byronis (Trin.) Steud. (1854); Ischaemum lutescens Hack. (1832); Spodiopogon byronis Trin. (1889)

= Ischaemum byrone =

Species of grass

Ischaemum byrone, commonly known as Hilo murainagrass or Hilo ischaemum, is a species of grass native to the Pacific Islands, including the Cook Islands, Fiji, Hawaiian Islands, New Caledonia, Niue, Society Islands, Tonga, Tubuai Islands, and Wallis and Futuna. In Hawaii it is found on the islands of Kauai, Maui, Molokai, and Hawaii but has unfortunately been extirpated from Oahu, where it was once known to grow. There are perhaps 1,000 to 3,000 individual plants remaining in total.

This grass is perennial, spreading via stolons, with stems reaching up to 80 centimetres (31 in) in maximum height. It usually grows at the coastline, often in cracks in the lava cliffs.

On the island of Hawaii, there are at least four populations and perhaps more scattered occurrences. At least one large occurrence has been recently destroyed by a lava flow at Hawaiʻi Volcanoes National Park. There are at least five occurrences on Kauai and six on Maui with up to several thousand plants existing. On Molokai, a 1994 count estimated about 1000 individuals.

Threats to this species include volcanism, development, trampling, non-native plants, fire, and off-road vehicles.

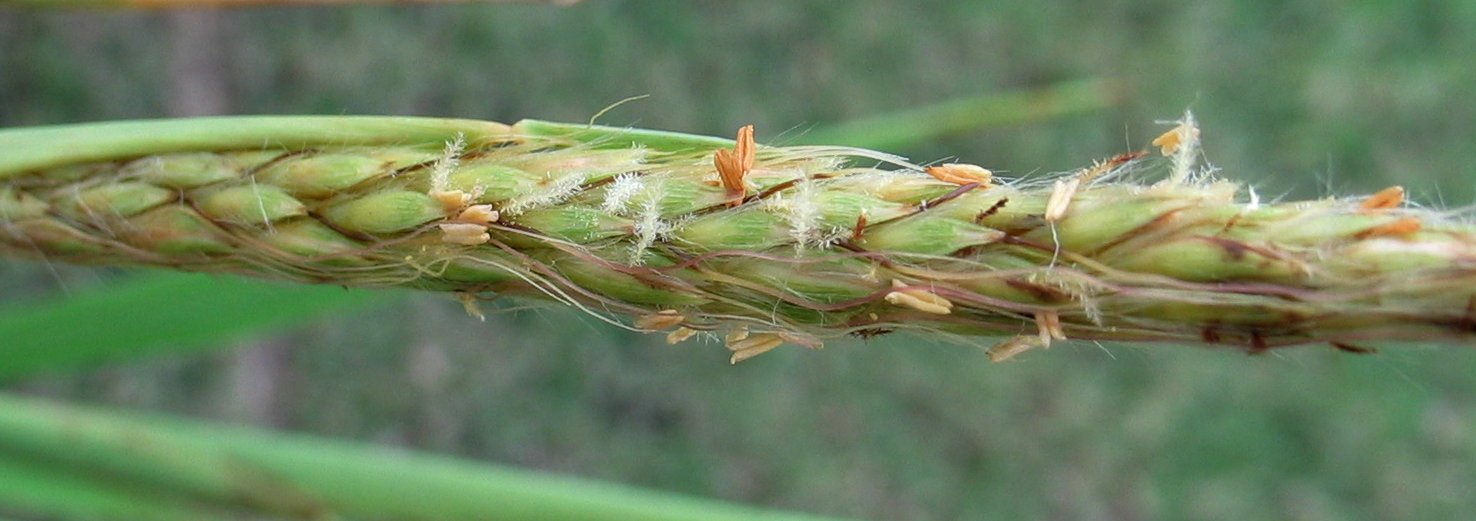
I. byrone flowering
