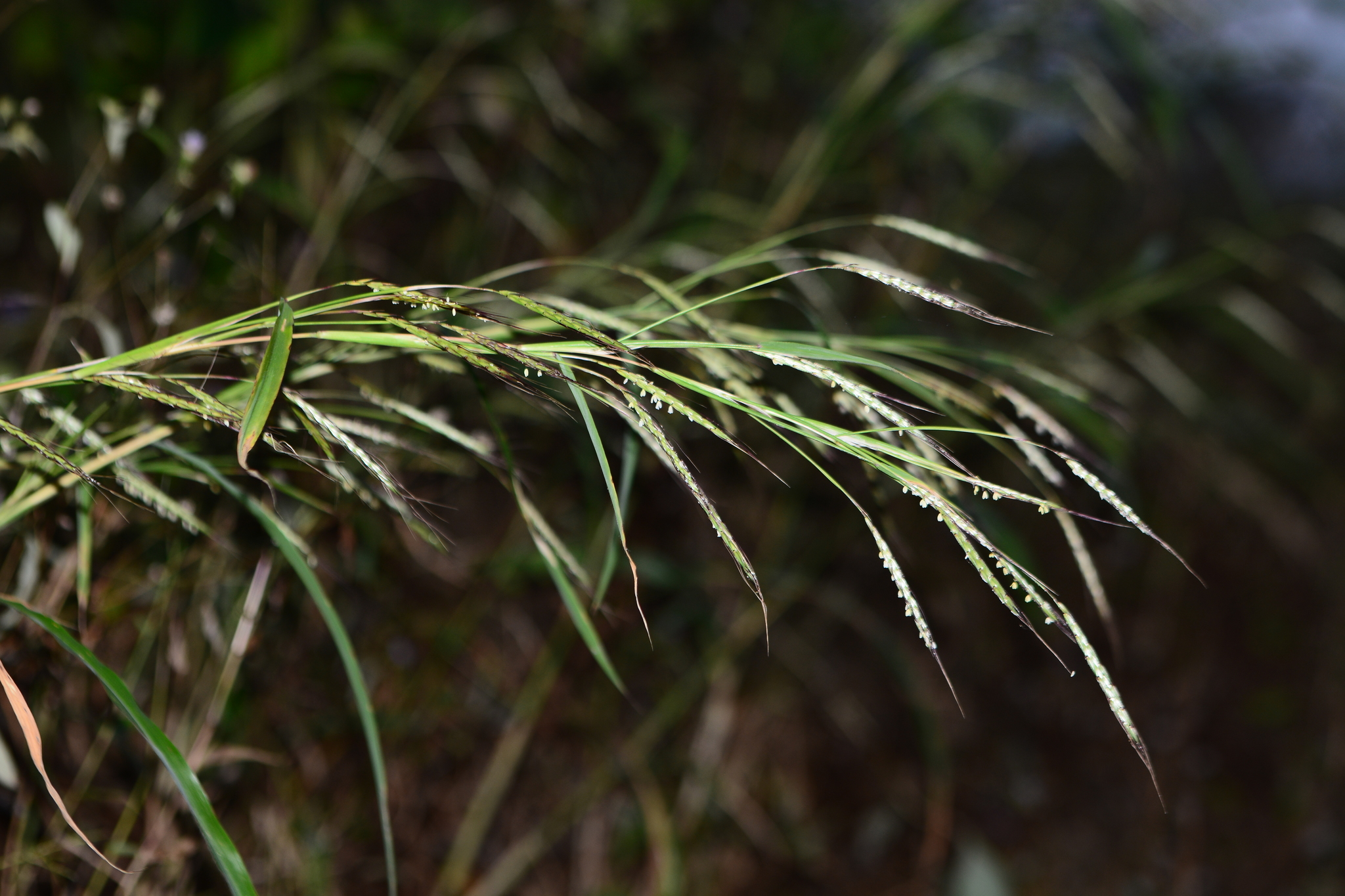
- Triplopogon ramosissimus

Scientific classification
- Kingdom: Plantae
- Clade: Tracheophytes
- Clade: Angiosperms
- Clade: Monocots
- Clade: Commelinids
- Order: Poales
- Family: Poaceae
- Subfamily: Panicoideae
- Supertribe: Andropogonodae
- Tribe: Andropogoneae
- Subtribe: Ischaeminae
- Genus: Triplopogon; Bor
- Species: T. ramosissimus

Binomial name
- Triplopogon ramosissimus (Hack.) Bor

Synonyms
- Ischaemum ramosissimum Hack.; Sehima ramosissimum (Hack.) Roberty; Ischaemum spathiflorum Hook.f.; Trachypogon fasciculatus Munro ex Hook.f.; Sehima spathiflorum (Hook.f.) Blatt. & McCann; Triplopogon spathiflorus (Hook.f.) Bor (type species)

= Triplopogon =

Genus of grasses

Triplopogon is a genus of plants in the grass family. The only known species is Triplopogon ramosissimus, native to Maharashtra, India.
