= Homozeugos =

Scientific classification
- Kingdom: Plantae
- Clade: Tracheophytes
- Clade: Angiosperms
- Clade: Monocots
- Clade: Commelinids
- Order: Poales
- Family: Poaceae
- Subfamily: Panicoideae
- Supertribe: Andropogonodae
- Tribe: Andropogoneae
- Subtribe: Saccharinae
- Genus: Homozeugos; Stapf

Type species
- Homozeugos fragile Stapf

Genus of grasses

Homozeugos is a genus of African plants in the grass family.

Species

- Homozeugos conciliatum Guala - Angola
- Homozeugos eylesii C.E.Hubb. - Tanzania, Zambia, Malawi
- Homozeugos fragile Stapf - Angola
- Homozeugos gossweileri Stapf - Angola
- Homozeugos huillense (Rendle) Stapf - Angola
- Homozeugos katakton Clayton - Angola, Zambia
