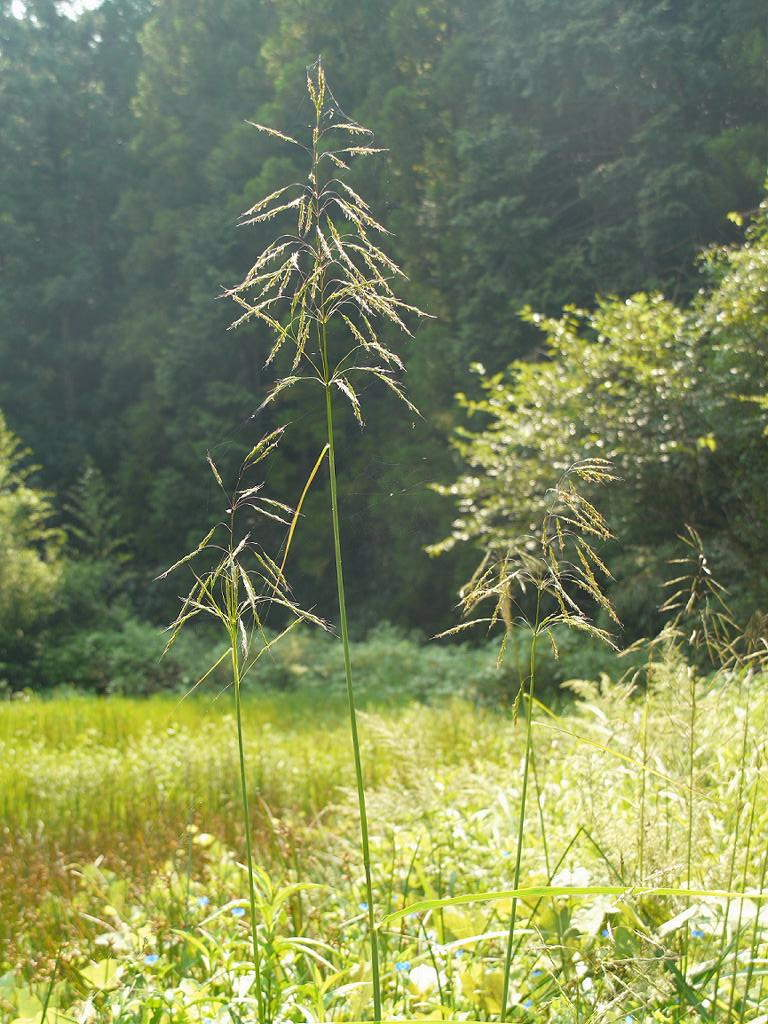
- Spodiopogon cotulifer in Tanabe city, Wakayama Prefecture, Japan

Scientific classification
- Kingdom: Plantae
- Clade: Tracheophytes
- Clade: Angiosperms
- Clade: Monocots
- Clade: Commelinids
- Order: Poales
- Family: Poaceae
- Subfamily: Panicoideae
- Genus: Spodiopogon
- Species: S. cotulifer

Binomial name
- Spodiopogon cotulifer (Thunb.) Hack.

= Spodiopogon cotulifer =

Species of grass

Spodiopogon cotulifer is a species of perennial grass in the family Poaceae. It is native to East and Southeast Asia.

It is the most likely wild progenitor of Spodiopogon formosanus, a cultivated millet that is endemic to Taiwan.
