= Andropterum =

Scientific classification
- Kingdom: Plantae
- Clade: Embryophytes
- Clade: Tracheophytes
- Clade: Spermatophytes
- Clade: Angiosperms
- Clade: Monocots
- Clade: Commelinids
- Order: Poales
- Family: Poaceae
- Subfamily: Panicoideae
- Supertribe: Andropogonodae
- Tribe: Andropogoneae
- Subtribe: Ischaeminae
- Genus: Andropterum; Stapf
- Species: A. stolzii

Binomial name
- Andropterum stolzii (Pilg.) C.E.Hubb.

Synonyms
- Ischaemum stolzii Pilg.; Andropterum variegatum Stapf.; Sehima variegatum (Stapf) Roberty

Genus of grasses

Andropterum is a genus of African plants in the grass family. There is only one known species, Andropterum stolzii, native to Zimbabwe, Zambia, Mozambique, Tanzania, Malawi and Burundi.

== See also ==
- List of Poaceae genera
