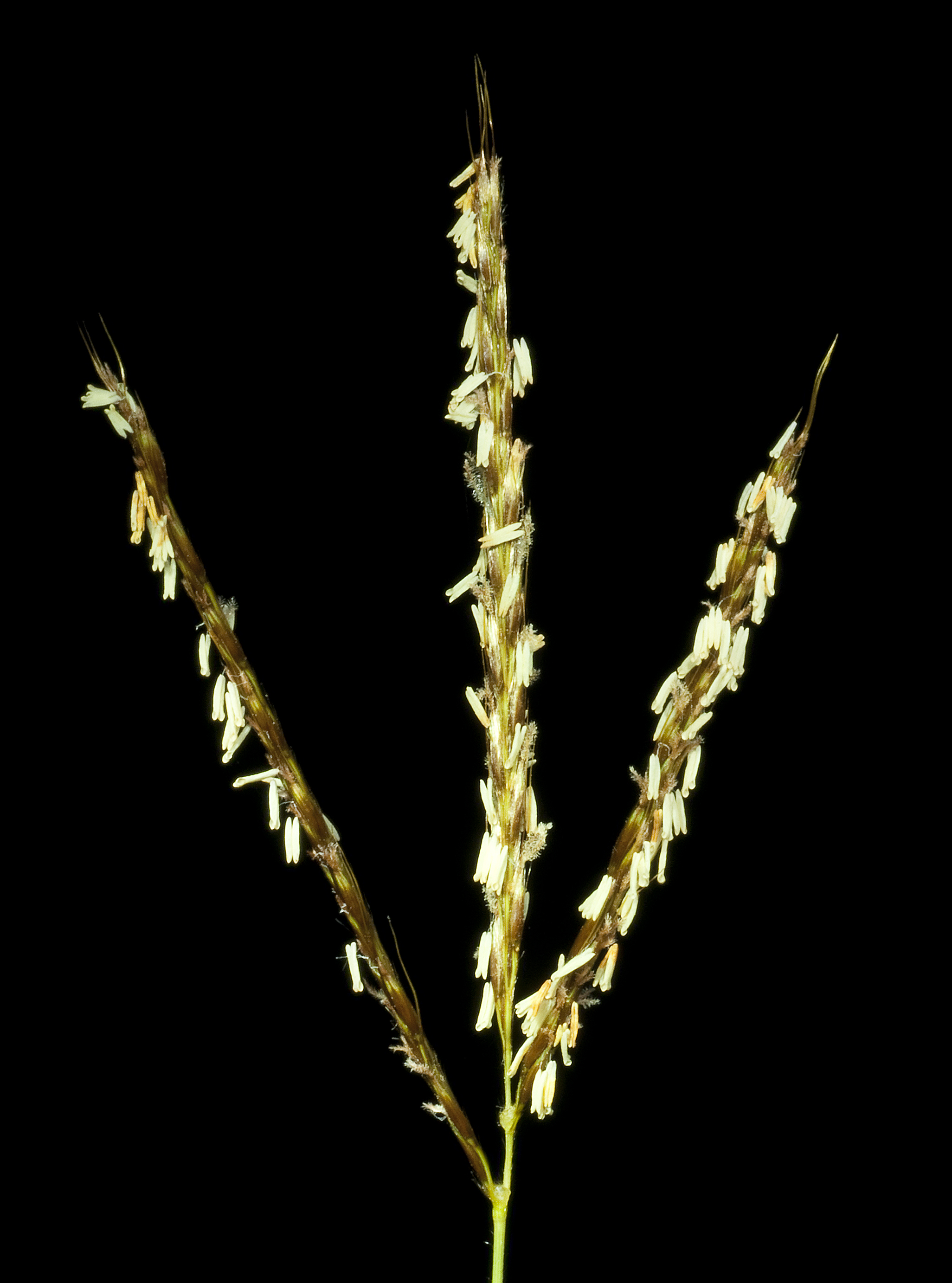

Scientific classification
- Kingdom: Plantae
- Clade: Tracheophytes
- Clade: Angiosperms
- Clade: Monocots
- Clade: Commelinids
- Order: Poales
- Family: Poaceae
- Subfamily: Panicoideae
- Genus: Eulalia
- Species: E. aurea

Binomial name
- Eulalia aurea (Bory) Kunth

Synonyms
- Andropogon aureovillosus Steud. Andropogon aureus Bory; Andropogon fulvispica Steud. Erianthus fulvus (R.Br.) Kunth; Eulalia elata Peter; Eulalia ferruginea Stapf; Eulalia fulva (R.Br.) Kuntze; Eulalia geniculata Stapf; Pogonatherum aureum (Bory) Roberty; Pollinia aurea (Bory) Benth. Pollinia cumingii var. fulva (R.Br.) Hack. Pollinia fulva (R.Br.) Benth. Pollinia homblei De Wild. Saccharum aureum (Bory) Spreng. Saccharum fulvum R.Br.

= Eulalia aurea =

Species of grass

Eulalia aurea is a grass (in the Poaceae family). It was first described as Andropogon aureum in 1804 by Bory de Saint-Vincent but was transferred to the genus, Eulalia, in 1830 by Kunth.

The Walmajarri people of the southern Kimberley call it "Water grass" and Jirtapuru.

== Distribution ==
It is found in southern Africa, Madagascar, Southeast Asia, and Australia. Within Australia, it is found in all mainland states and territories.

== Gallery ==
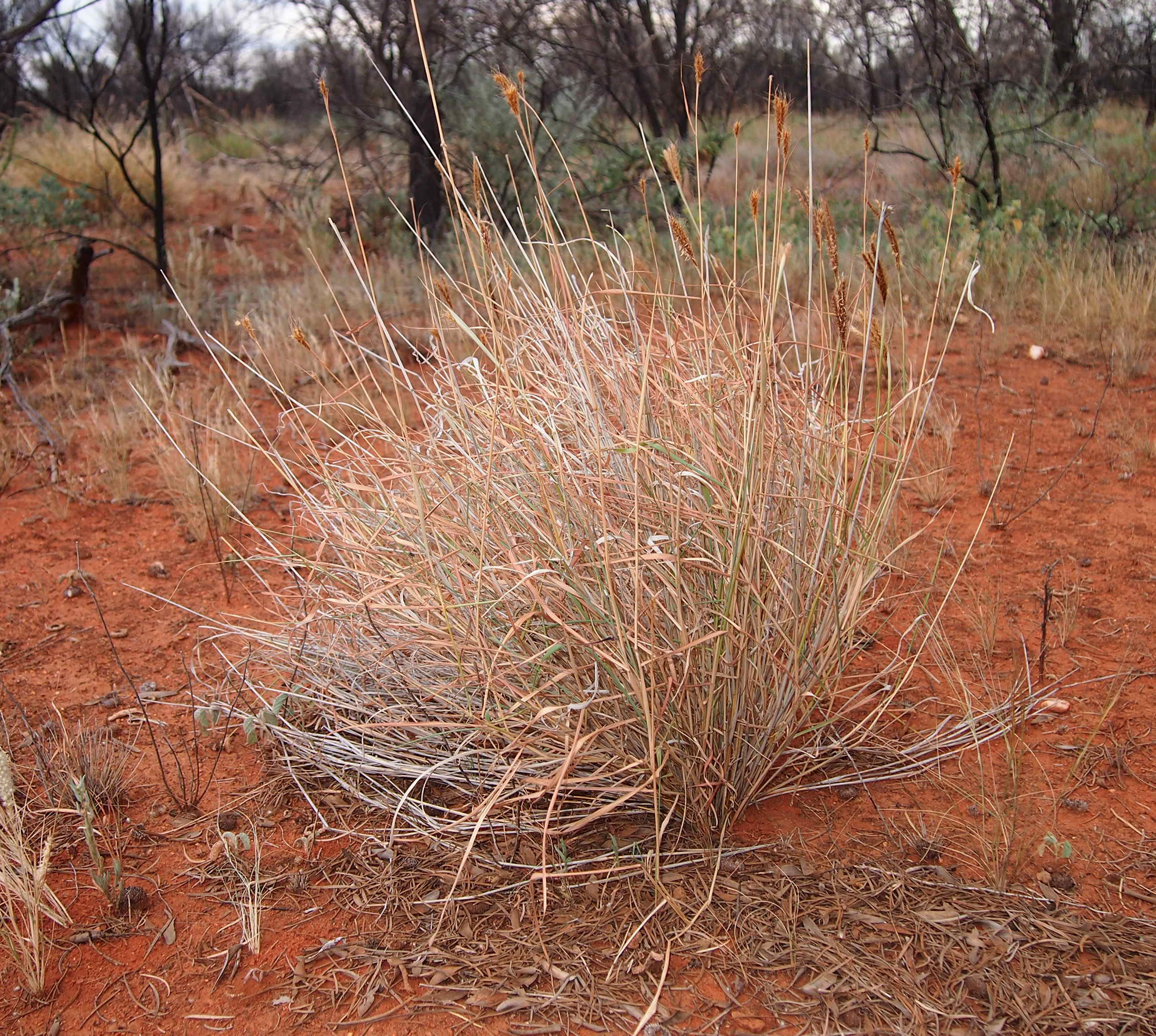
habit

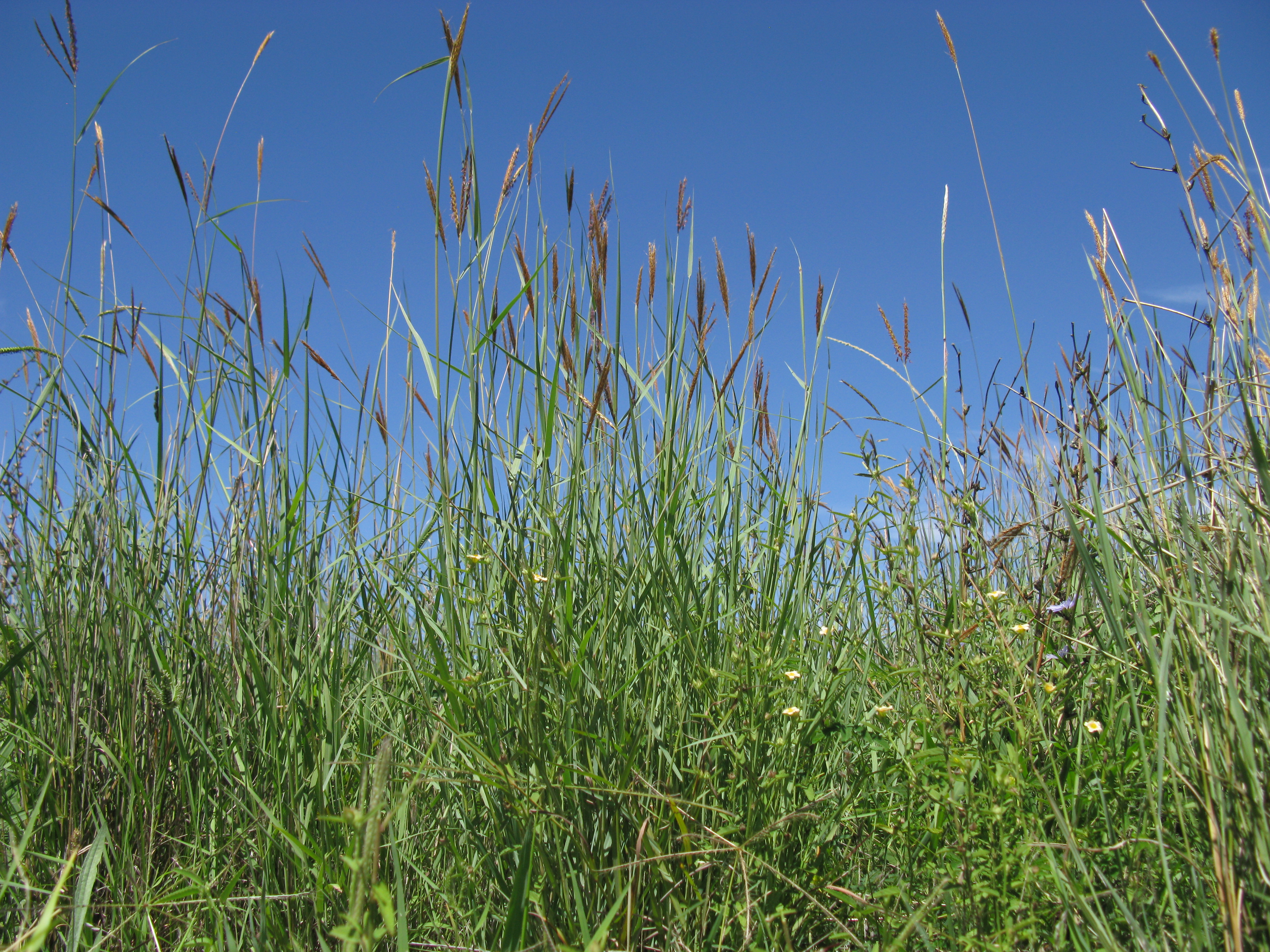
habit

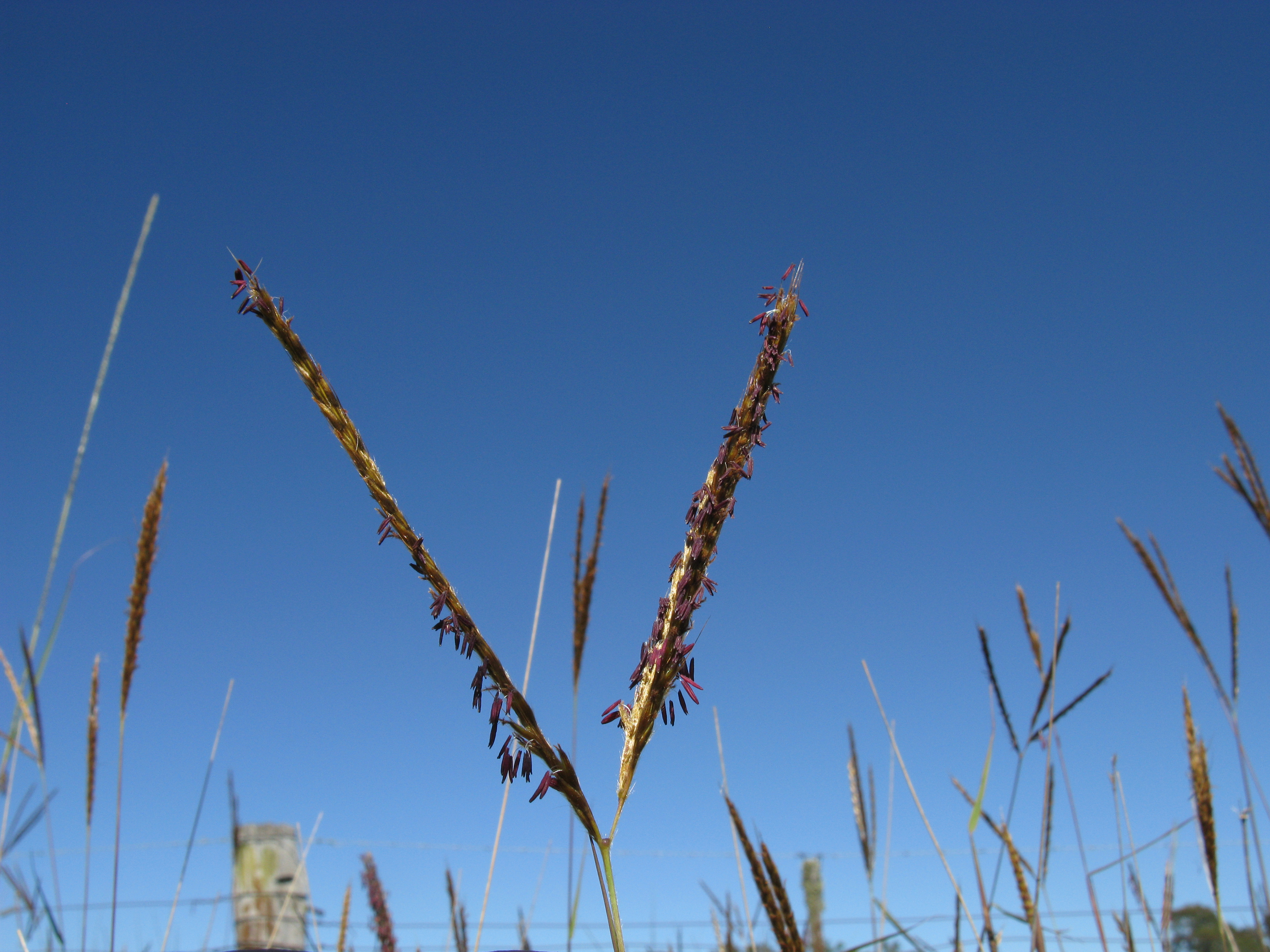
flower head
