= Ischaemum polystachyum =

Scientific classification
- Kingdom: Plantae
- Clade: Tracheophytes
- Clade: Angiosperms
- Clade: Monocots
- Clade: Commelinids
- Order: Poales
- Family: Poaceae
- Subfamily: Panicoideae
- Genus: Ischaemum
- Species: I. polystachyum

Binomial name
- Ischaemum polystachyum J.Presl

Species of grass

Ischaemum polystachyum, the paddle grass, is a species of perennial in the family Poaceae. It is a common species found in New Guinea and the Pacific Islands, and is often found on roadsides and in gardens. It has become an invasive species in Pohnpei, Micronesia, where it was first introduced as cattle fodder.
