= Pseudopogonatherum =

Scientific classification
- Kingdom: Plantae
- Clade: Tracheophytes
- Clade: Angiosperms
- Clade: Monocots
- Clade: Commelinids
- Order: Poales
- Family: Poaceae
- Subfamily: Panicoideae
- Supertribe: Andropogonodae
- Tribe: Andropogoneae
- Subtribe: Saccharinae
- Genus: Pseudopogonatherum; A.Camus

Type species
- Pseudopogonatherum irritans (R.Br.) A.Camus

Synonyms
- Puliculum Stapf ex Haines

Genus of grasses

Pseudopogonatherum is a genus of Asian and Australian plants in the grass family.

Species

- Pseudopogonatherum contortum (Brongn.) A.Camus - China, Indian Subcontinent, Southeast Asia
- Pseudopogonatherum filifolium (S.L.Chen) H.Yu, Y.F.Deng & N.X.Zhao - Anhui
- Pseudopogonatherum irritans (R.Br.) A.Camus - Myanmar, Thailand, Philippines, New Guinea, Australia
- Pseudopogonatherum quadrinerve (Hack.) Ohwi - Japan, Korea, China, Himalayas, Indochina, Malaysia, Indonesia
- Pseudopogonatherum speciosum (Debeaux) Ohwi - Japan, Korea, China, Himalayas, Indochina, Malaysia, Philippines
- Pseudopogonatherum trispicatum (Schult.) Ohwi - Yunnan, Indian Subcontinent, Southeast Asia, New Guinea, Australia
