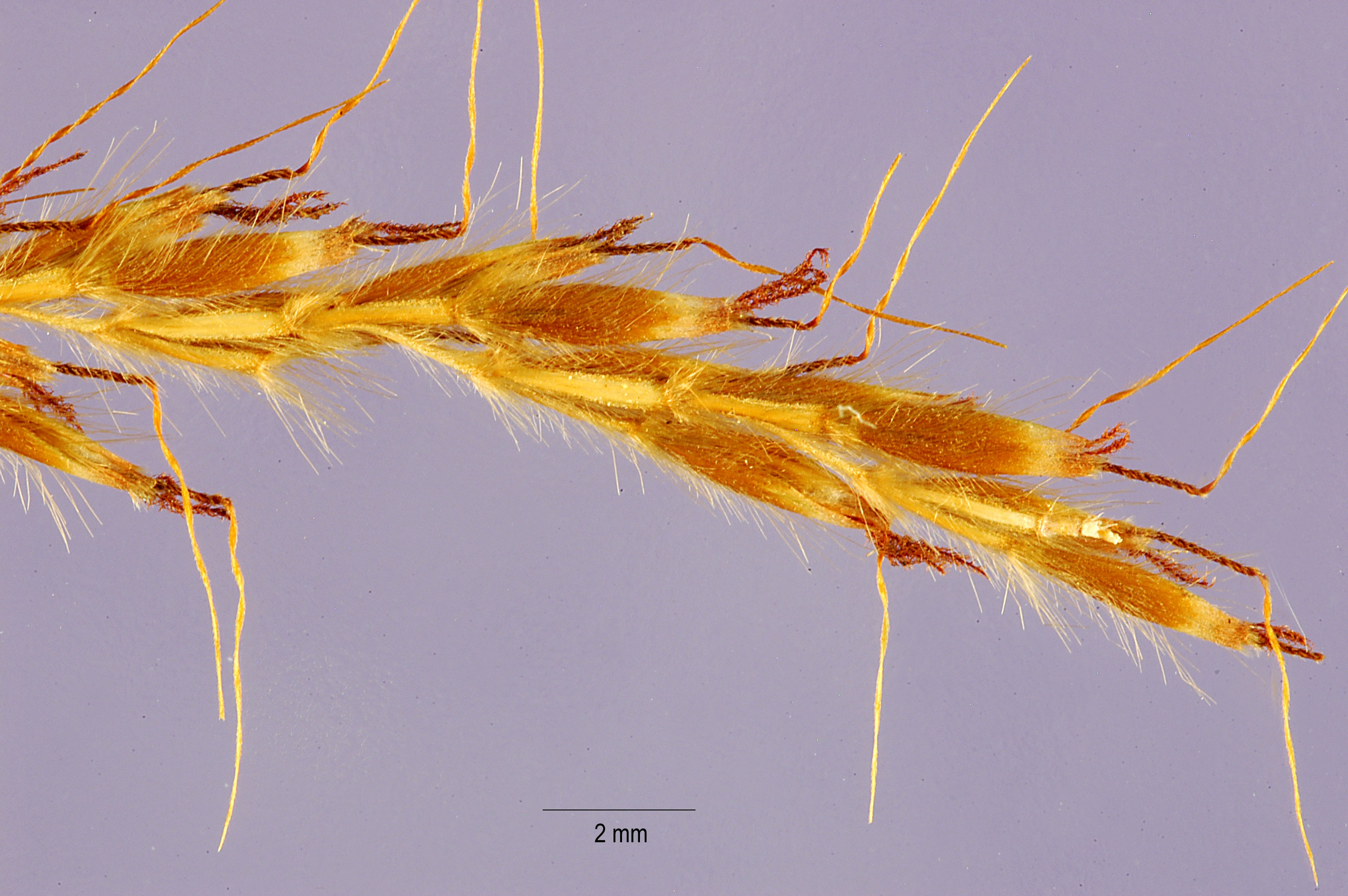

Scientific classification
- Kingdom: Plantae
- Clade: Tracheophytes
- Clade: Angiosperms
- Clade: Monocots
- Clade: Commelinids
- Order: Poales
- Family: Poaceae
- Subfamily: Panicoideae
- Supertribe: Andropogonodae
- Tribe: Andropogoneae
- Subtribe: Saccharinae
- Genus: Polytrias; Hack.
- Species: P. indica

Binomial name
- Polytrias indica (Houtt.) Veldkamp

Synonyms
- Aethonopogon Hack. ex Kuntze; Eulalia subg. Polytrias (Hack.) Ohwi; Eulalia sect. Polytrias (Hackel) Pilger.; Phleum indicum Houtt.; Polytrias amaura (Buse) Kuntze; Aethonopogon praemorsus Hack. ex Kuntze; Pollinia praemorsa Nees; Polytrias racemosa (Nees) Hack.; Ischaemum indicum (Houtt.) Merr.; Andropogon amaurus Buse; Andropogon diversiflorus Steud.; Andropogon firmandus Steud.; Pollinia praemorsa Nees ex Steud.; Polytrias praemorsa (Nees ex Steud.) Hack.; Aethonopogon praemorsus Hack. ex Kuntze; Polytrias amaura var. pallida Kuntze; Polytrias diversiflora (Steud.) Nash; Eulalia praemorsa (Nees ex Steud.) Stapf ex Ridl.; Eulalia amaura Ohwi; Pogonatherum amaurum Roberty; Eulalia nana Keng & S.L.Chen; Polytrias amaura var. nana (Keng & S.L.Chen) S.L.Chen; Polytrias indica var. nana (Keng & S.L.Chen) S.M.Phillips & S.L.Chen

= Polytrias =

Genus of plants

Polytrias is a genus of Asian, African, and Pacific Island plants in the grass family, commonly called Java grass, Batiki bluegrass, Indian murainagrass, or toto grass. The only known species is Polytrias indica, native to West Africa (from Senegal to Cameroon), Seychelles, the Indian subcontinent, southern China, Southeast Asia, New Guinea, Fiji, and Micronesia. It is also cultivated as a lawn grass in other tropical regions, and naturalized in scattered locations in tropical North and South America.
