= History of sugar =

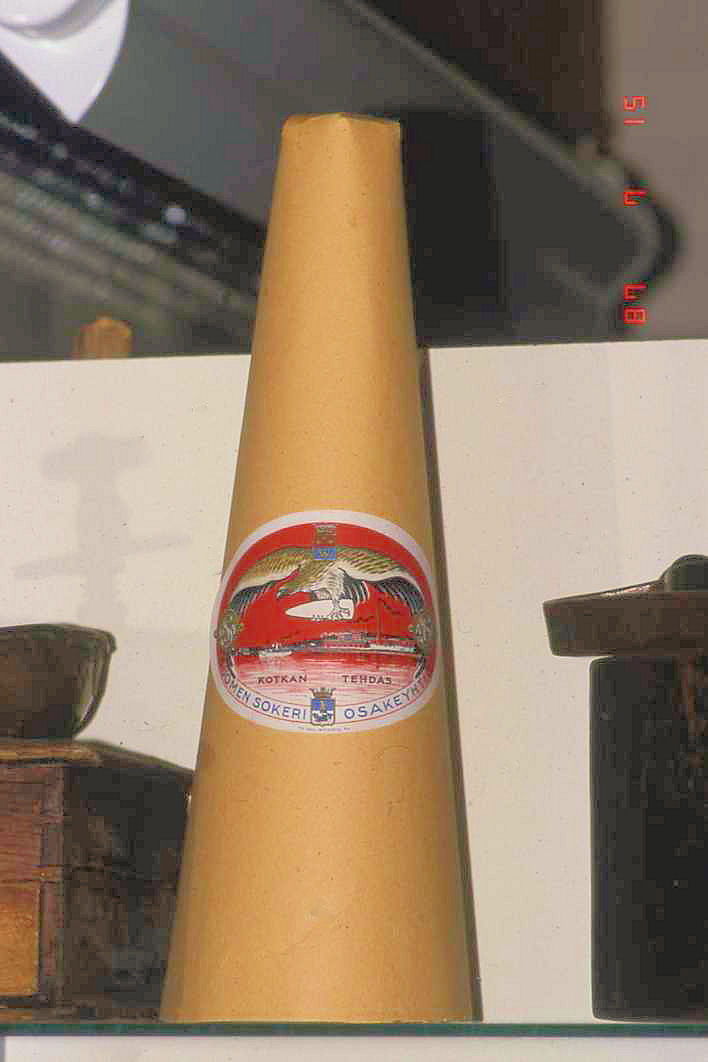
A sugarloaf was the traditional shape of sugar in the eighteenth century: a semi-hard sugar cone, usually with a rounded top, that required a sugar axe or sugar hammer to break up and sugar nips to reduce to usable pieces.

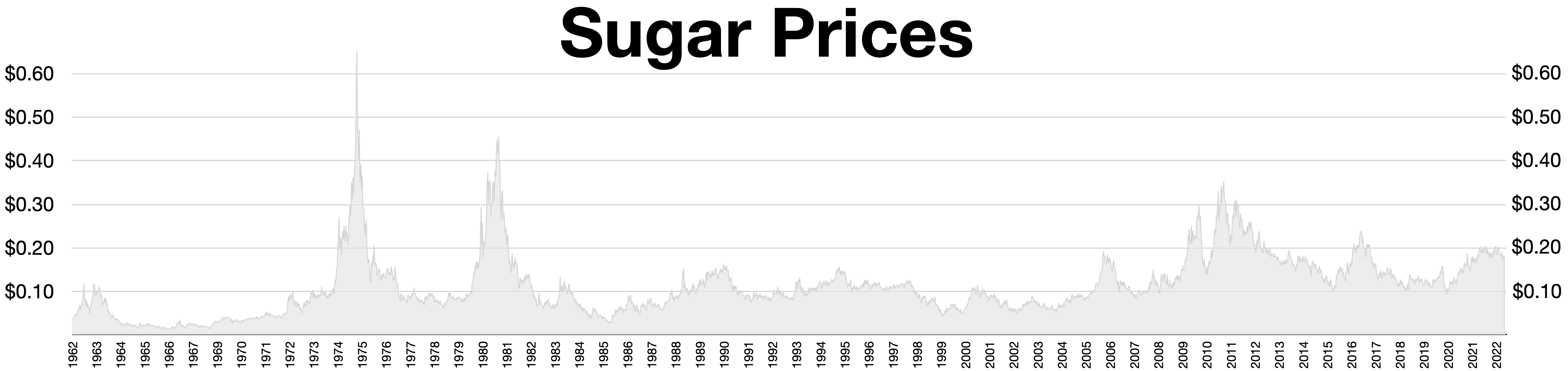
Sugar Prices 1962–2022, US dollars per pound; not adjusted to inflation

The history of sugar mainly concerns the background in the production of sucrose, the principal component of table sugar. One can break down the history in many ways, but all history begins in Asia followed by the migration of cultivation and associated industry.

== Origins of sugarcane ==
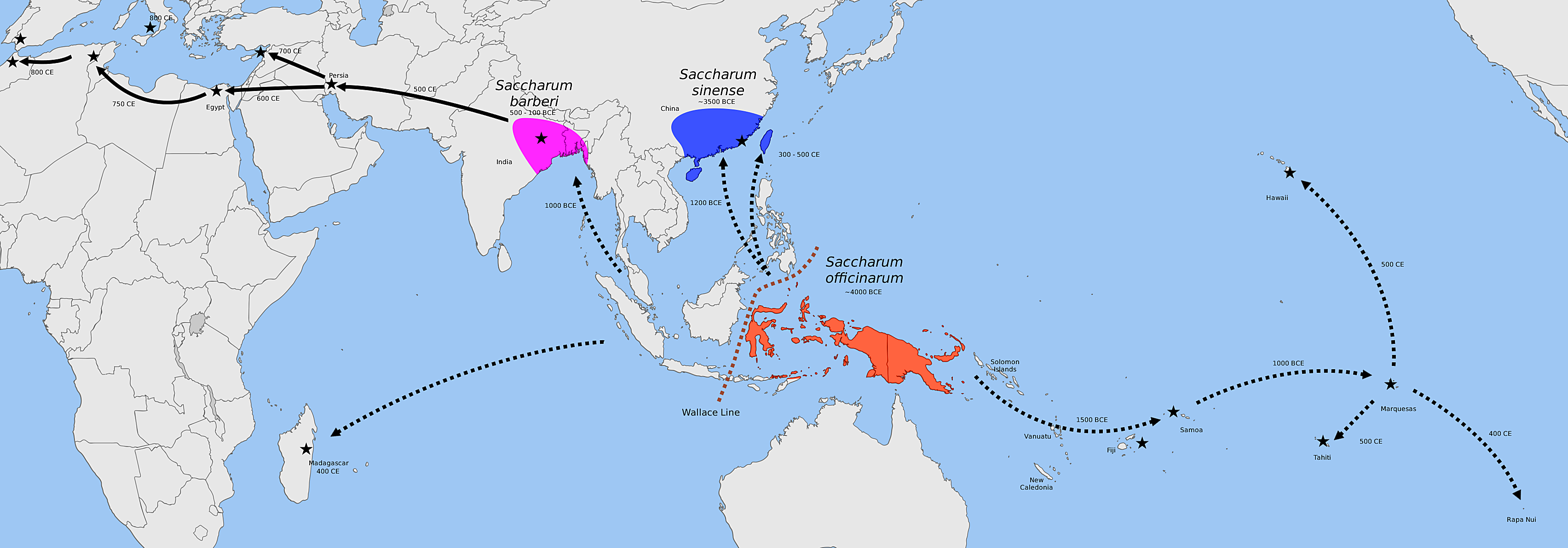
Map showing centers of origin of Saccharum officinarum in New Guinea, S. sinensis in southern China and Taiwan, and S. barberi in India; dotted arrows represent Austronesian introductions

There are two centers of domestication for sugarcane: one for Saccharum officinarum by Papuans in New Guinea and another for Saccharum sinense by Austronesians in Taiwan and southern China. Papuans and Austronesians originally primarily used sugarcane as food for domesticated pigs. The spread of both S. officinarum and S. sinense is closely linked to the migrations of the Austronesian peoples. Saccharum barberi was only cultivated in India after the introduction of S. officinarum.

Saccharum officinarum was first domesticated in New Guinea and the islands east of the Wallace Line by Papuans, where it is the modern center of diversity. Beginning at around 4000 BC they were selectively bred from the native Saccharum robustum. From New Guinea it spread westwards to Island Southeast Asia after contact with Austronesians, where it hybridized with Saccharum spontaneum.

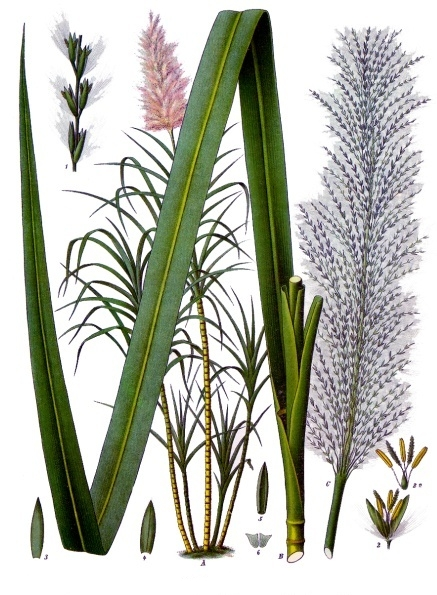
Saccharum officinarum – sugar cane

The second domestication center is mainland southern China and Taiwan where S. sinense was a primary cultigen of the Austronesian peoples. Words for sugarcane exist in the Proto-Austronesian languages in Taiwan, reconstructed as *təbuS or **CebuS, which became *tebuh in Proto-Malayo-Polynesian. It was one of the original major crops of the Austronesian peoples from at least 3500 BC. Introduction of the sweeter S. officinarum may have gradually replaced it throughout its cultivated range in Island Southeast Asia.

From Island Southeast Asia, S. officinarum was spread eastward into Polynesia and Micronesia by Austronesian voyagers as a canoe plant by around 1500 BC. It was also spread westward and northward by around 1000 BC to China and India by Austronesian traders, where it further hybridized with Saccharum sinense and Saccharum barberi. From there it spread further into western Eurasia and the Mediterranean.

There is speculation among scholars people in Polynesia may have produced granulated cane sugar because of the simple process. However evidence is limited because of the lack of writing. The first credible written evidence for granulated sugar dates to ancient India, the process described the refining of cane juice into granulated crystals and was often visited by imperial convoys (such as those from China) to learn about cultivation and sugar refining. By the sixth century AD, sugar cultivation and processing had reached Persia. In the Mediterranean, sugarcane was possibly brought through the Arab medieval expansion. "Wherever they went, the medieval Arabs brought with them sugar, the product and the technology of its production."

== Asia ==
Sugarcane is native of tropical areas such as the Indian subcontinent (South Asia) and Southeast Asia and Southern China and Taiwan. Different species seem to have originated from different locations; Saccharum barberi originated in India, and S. edule and S. officinarum came from New Guinea. One of the earliest historical references to sugarcane is in a Chinese manuscripts dating to the 8th century BCE, which described sugar cane farming and production in Ancient India.

In the tradition of Indian medicine (āyurveda), sugarcane is known by the name Ikṣu, and sugarcane juice is known as Phāṇita. Its varieties, synonyms and characteristics are defined in nighaṇṭus such as the Bhāvaprakāśa (1.6.23, group of sugarcanes). Sugar cane juice may have been turned into granulated cane sugar by Polynesians however evidence of this is limited because of the lack of writing and only speculated among scholars.Sugar remained relatively unimportant until around 350 AD when Indians discovered methods of turning sugarcane juice into granulated crystals that were easier to store and transport. It was then considered as 'sweet spice' and Indian traders started trading sugar outside India.

In the Sanskrit Indian language, these crystals were called khanda (Devanagari: खण्ड, Khaṇḍa), which is the source of the word candy. Indian sailors, who carried clarified butter and sugar as supplies, introduced knowledge of sugar along the various trade routes they travelled. Traveling Buddhist monks took sugar crystallization methods to China. During the reign of Harsha (r. 606–647) in North India, Indian envoys in Tang China taught methods of cultivating sugarcane after Emperor Taizong of Tang (r. 626–649) made known his interest in sugar. China established its first sugarcane plantations in the seventh century. Chinese documents confirm at least two missions to India, initiated in 647 CE, to obtain technology for sugar refining.

The derivation of the word "sugar" is thought to be from Sanskrit शर्करा (śarkarā), meaning "ground or candied sugar," originally "grit, gravel". Sanskrit literature from ancient India, conventionally dated by modern scholarship to roughly c. 1500–500 BCE, although these works were transmitted orally for centuries and do not survive as written documents, provides the first references of the cultivation of sugar cane and of the manufacture of sugar in the Indian subcontinent.

The major industrialization of sugar production in the New World eventually rejuvenated sugar production in Asia. This rebalancing was expedited by the abolition of slavery, which had given the New World an economic advantage. In addition to India, Indonesia and Thailand became major exporters of sugar.

== Middle East ==
The cultivation and knowledge of sugar cane migrated to the Middle East. Often this migration was attributed to the influence of Nearchus, admiral of Alexander the Great. He had learned of sugar in 325 BC through his participation in the campaign of India led by Alexander (Arrian, Anabasis). Eventually this knowledge led to major production in Persia, Syria, Cyprus, Sicily, and especially Egypt. These technologies were largely destroyed by the Turks.

== Europe ==
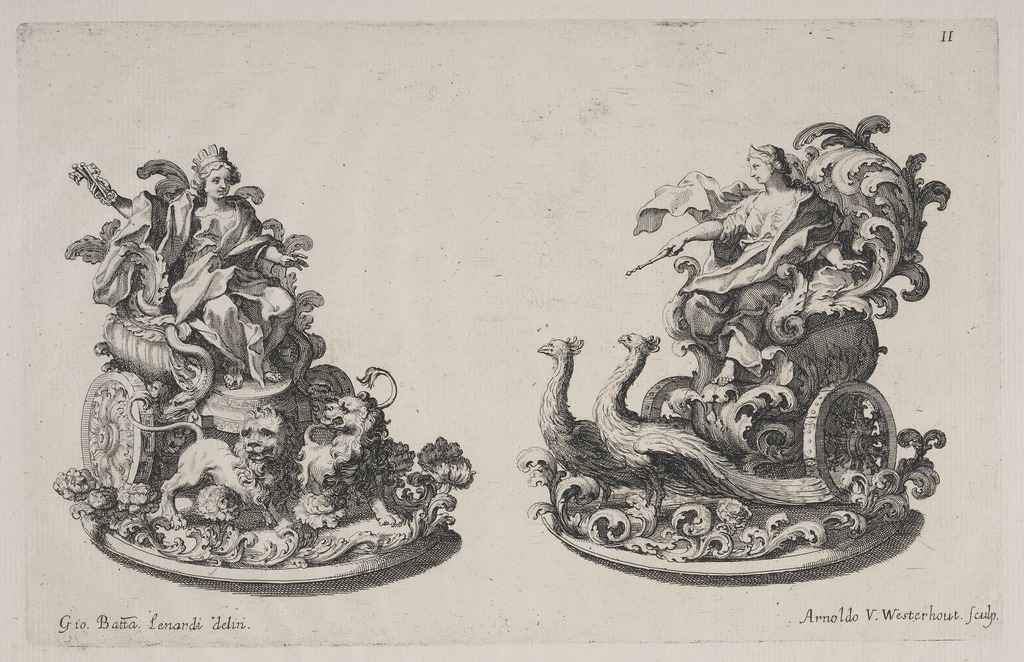
Two elaborate sugar triomfi of goddesses for a dinner given by the Earl of Castlemaine, British ambassador in Rome, 1687

The Greek physician Pedanius Dioscorides (c. 40–90 AD) attested to the quality of Indian sugar in his 1st century CE medical treatise De Materia Medica:

There is a kind of coalesced honey called sakcharon [i.e. sugar] found in reeds in India and Eudaimon Arabia similar in consistency to salt and brittle enough to be broken between the teeth like salt,

— Pedanius Dioscorides, Materia Medica, Book II

The Roman Pliny the Elder also described sugar in his 1st century CE Natural History: "Sugar is made in Arabia as well, but Indian sugar is better. It is a kind of honey found in cane, white as gum, and it crunches between the teeth. It comes in lumps the size of a hazelnut. Sugar is used only for medical purposes."

Crusaders brought sugar back to Europe after their campaigns in the Holy Land, where they encountered caravans carrying "sweet salt". Early in the 12th century, the Republic of Venice acquired some villages near Tyre and set up estates to produce sugar for export to Europe. It supplemented the use of honey, which had previously been the only available sweetener. Crusade chronicler William of Tyre, writing in the late 12th century, described sugar as "very necessary for the use and health of mankind". In the 15th century, Venice was the chief sugar refining and distribution center in Europe.

A feast given in Tours in 1457 by Gaston de Foix, which is "probably the best and most complete account we have of a late medieval banquet" includes the first mention of sugar sculptures, as the final food brought in was "a heraldic menagerie sculpted in sugar: lions, stags, monkeys ... each holding in paw or beak the arms of the Hungarian king". Other recorded grand feasts in the decades following included similar pieces. Originally the sculptures seem to have been eaten in the meal, but later they become merely table decorations, the most elaborate called trionfi. Several significant sculptors are known to have produced them; in some cases their preliminary drawings survive. Early ones were in brown sugar, partly cast in molds, with the final touches carved. They continued to be used until at least the Coronation Banquet for Edward VII of the United Kingdom in 1903; among other sculptures every guest was given a sugar crown to take away.

Genoa, one of the centers of distribution, became known for candied fruit, while Venice specialized in pastries, sweets (candies), and sugar sculptures. Sugar was considered to have "valuable medicinal properties" as a "warm" food under prevailing categories, being "helpful to the stomach, to cure cold diseases, and sooth lung complaints".

== Canary Islands and Madeira ==
The Canary Islands and the island of Madeira played a central role in the western migration of the sugar industry. Spanish and Portuguese exploration and conquest in the fifteenth century carried sugar southwest of Iberia. Henry the Navigator introduced cane to Madeira in 1425, while the Spanish, having eventually subdued the Canary Islands, introduced sugar cane to them. By 1492, Madeira was producing over 1,400,000 kilograms (3,000,000 lb) of sugar annually.

Known worldwide by the end of the medieval period, sugar was very expensive and was considered a "fine spice", but from about the year 1500, technological improvements and New World sources began turning it into a much cheaper bulk commodity.

== Caribbean and South America ==
In 1493, on his second voyage, Christopher Columbus carried sugarcane seedlings to the New World, in particular Hispaniola. The first sugar harvest happened in Hispaniola in 1501; and many sugar mills had been constructed in Cuba and Jamaica by the 1520s. The approximately 3,000 small sugar mills that were built before 1550 in the New World created an unprecedented demand for cast iron gears, levers, axles and other implements. Specialist trades in mold-making and iron casting developed in Europe due to the expansion of sugar production. Sugar mill construction sparked development of the technological skills needed for a nascent Industrial Revolution in the early 17th century. Soon Colonial Brazil became the epicenter. By 1540, there were 800 cane sugar mills in Santa Catarina Island and there were another 2,000 on the north coast of Brazil, Demarara, and Surinam. After 1625, sugarcane was introduced to the Caribbean islands from South America by the Dutch. Cultivation expanded across the region, including areas such as Barbados and the Virgin Islands.

During the 18th century, sugar became enormously popular. Great Britain, for example, consumed five times as much sugar in 1770 as in 1710. By 1750, sugar surpassed grain as "the most valuable commodity in European trade — it made up a fifth of all European imports and in the last decades of the century four-fifths of the sugar came from the British and French colonies in the West Indies." From the 1740s until the 1820s, sugar was Britain's most valuable import.

The sugar market went through a series of booms. The heightened demand and production of sugar came about to a large extent due to a great change in the eating habits of many Europeans. For example, they began consuming jams, candy, tea, coffee, cocoa, processed foods, and other sweet victuals in much greater amounts. In Britain, tea sweetened with sugar became a daily staple not only among the wealthy but also among the working class. Short tea breaks during the workday allowed laborers to quickly replenish energy, with sugary tea serving as an affordable and accessible source of calories, particularly for those engaged in physically demanding jobs.

Reacting to this increasing trend, the colonies in the Caribbean islands set about producing still more sugar. In fact, they produced up to ninety percent of the sugar that the western Europeans consumed. Some islands proved more successful than others when it came to producing the product. In Barbados and the British Leeward Islands, sugar provided 93% and 97% respectively of exports.

Planters later began developing ways to boost production even more. For example, they developed more advanced mills and began using better types of sugarcane. In the eighteenth century "the French colonies were the most successful, especially Saint-Domingue, where better irrigation, water-power and machinery, together with concentration on newer types of sugar, increased profits." Despite these and other improvements, the price of sugar reached soaring heights, especially during events such as the revolt against the Dutch and the Napoleonic Wars. Sugar remained in high demand, and the islands' planters knew exactly how to take advantage of the situation.

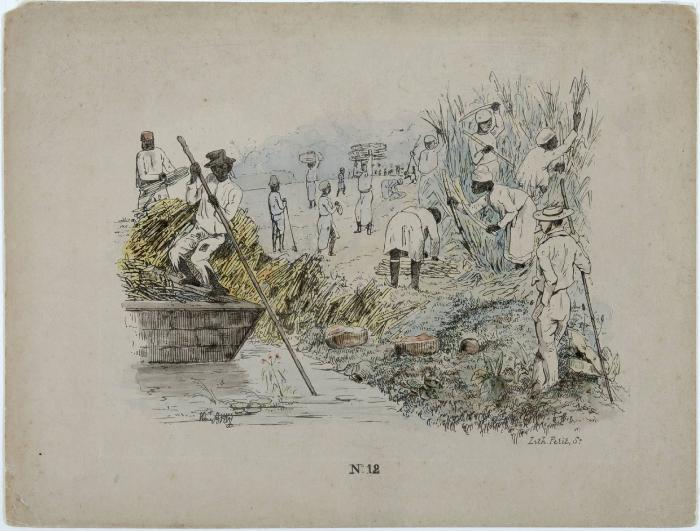
A 19th-century lithograph by Theodore Bray showing a sugarcane plantation. On right is "white officer", the European overseer. Enslaved workers toil during the harvest. To the left is a flat-bottomed vessel for cane transportation.

As Europeans established sugar plantations on the larger Caribbean islands, prices fell in Europe. By the 18th century all levels of society had become common consumers of the former luxury product. At first most sugar in Britain went into tea, but later confectionery and chocolates became extremely popular. Many Britons (especially children) also ate jams. Suppliers commonly sold sugar in the form of a sugarloaf and consumers required sugar nips, a pliers-like tool, to break off pieces.

In the 19th century Cuba rose to become the richest land in the Caribbean (with sugar as its dominant crop) because it formed the only major island landmass free of mountainous terrain. Instead, nearly three-quarters of its land formed a rolling plain — ideal for planting crops. Cuba also prospered above other islands because Cubans used better methods when harvesting the sugar crops: they adopted modern milling methods such as watermills, enclosed furnaces, steam engines, and vacuum pans. All these technologies increased productivity. Cuba also retained slavery longer than most of the rest of the Caribbean islands.

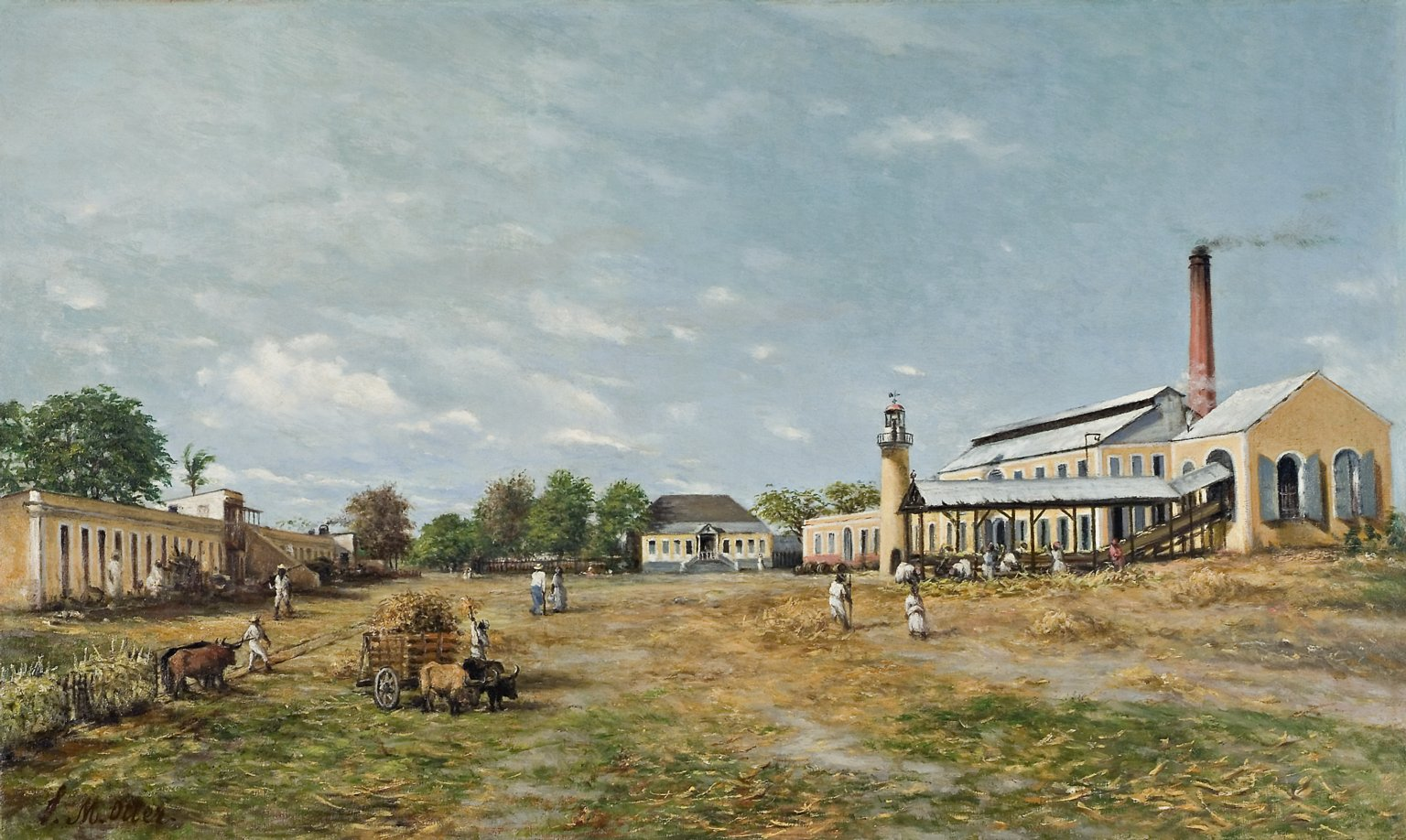
Hacienda La Fortuna. A sugar mill complex in Puerto Rico, painted by Francisco Oller in 1885. Brooklyn Museum

Beginning in the mid-1740s, the French colony of Saint-Domingue emerged as the world's largest producer of sugar. However, following the abolition of slavery and the colony's independence in 1804, sugar production declined sharply. In the following decades, Cuba surpassed Saint-Domingue and became the leading global producer of sugar.

The industrialization of the Colombian industry started in 1901 with the establishment of Manuelita, the first steam-powered sugar mill in South America, by Latvian Jewish immigrant James Martin Eder.

== United States ==
In the United States, sugarcane was grown by enslaved Black laborers and, after the Civil War, Chinese migrant workers on Louisiana's sugar plantations, which were started by plantation owners who escaped Saint-Domingue after the Haitian Revolution and the Louisiana Purchase. The first commercial sugarcane crop was produced in Louisiana in 1795 by the French Creole planter Étienne de Boré and Saint-Domingue chemist Antoine Morin. Plantation owners like the Heydels, who owned Whitney Plantation, converted their land from indigo and rice to sugar after 1795 as well. As the US's largest slave market was located in New Orleans, sugar producers used enslaved Black labor to make Louisiana the producer of almost 25% of the world's exportable sugar by 1853. Just before the Civil War, Louisiana's sugar industry was worth more than $200 million, with "more than half of that figure represent[ing] the valuation of the ownership of human beings." Enslaved laborers resisted the conditions on sugarcane plantations. During the 1811 German Coast uprising, as many as 500 enslaved workers burned sugar plantations as they marched to New Orleans. During the CivIl War, W.E.B. DuBois wrote in his Black Reconstruction, Black cane workers abandoned cane plantations and the industry essentially collapsed. Following the war, Louisiana planters engaged Chinese workers in exploitative multi-year labor contracts; these laborers lived in segregated quarters and earned 30% less than local Black laborers.

== Globalization of cane sugar ==
After being established in Brazil and the Caribbean area, sugar production spread to newer European colonies in Africa and in the Pacific. It became especially important in Fiji. Mauritius, Natal, and Queensland (Australia).

== Role of slavery and indentured workers ==
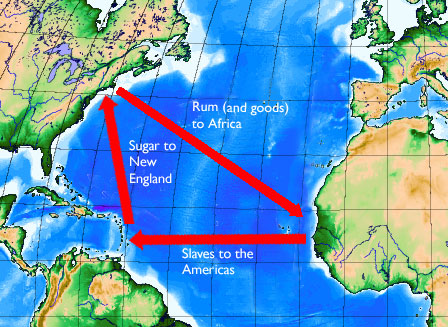
The Triangular trade – enslaved people were imported into the Caribbean Islands to plant and harvest sugar cane.

Sugar is complicated and time-consuming to grow and process. More so than tobacco, and even more so than cotton, sugar demanded far more labour, capital and expertise for successful cultivation and processing. This aspect led to the use of slavery. The labour force at first included European indentured servants and local Native American, and African enslaved people. However, European diseases such as smallpox and African ones such as malaria and yellow fever soon reduced the numbers of local Native Americans. Europeans were also very susceptible to malaria and yellow fever, and the supply of indentured servants was limited. African enslaved people became the primary labor force on sugar plantations, due to their relative resistance to diseases such as malaria and yellow fever, and the establishment of transatlantic slave trading systems along the African coast.

"When we work at the sugar-canes, and the mill snatches hold of a finger, they cut off the hand; and when we attempt to run away, they cut off the leg; both cases have happened to me. This is the price at which you eat sugar in Europe."

— Voltaire, Candide, Chap. 19

The abolition of slavery in the 1800s led to a partial shift in the sugar production away from the Americas back to East Asia.

Even as slavery faded, sugar production areas still tended to use indentured labour rather than enslaved people, with workers "shipped across the world ... [and] ... held in conditions of near slavery for up to ten years... In the second half of the nineteenth century over 450,000 indentured labourers went from India to the British West Indies, others went to Natal, Mauritius and Fiji (where they became a majority of the population). In Queensland workers from the Pacific islands were moved in. The Dutch transferred large numbers of people from Java to Surinam." Illustrative is the case of Hawaii, where hundreds of thousands of Chinese, Japanese, and Filipinos were brought in. It is said that the sugar plantations would not have thrived without the aid of the African enslaved people. In Colombia, the planting of sugar started very early on, and entrepreneurs imported many African enslaved people to cultivate the fields.

In more modern times, the sugar industry remained notorious for poor working conditions, even in England.

== The rise of beet sugar ==
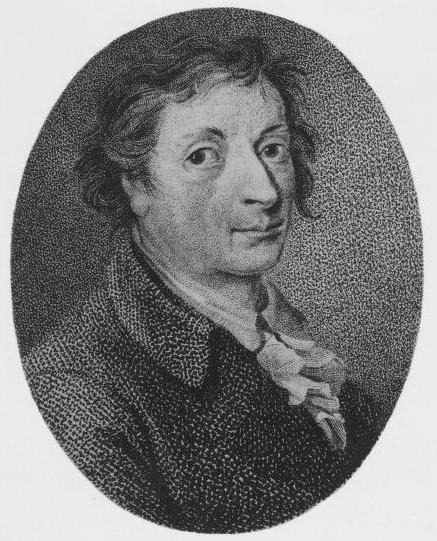
German chemists Andreas Sigismund Marggraf and Franz Karl Achard (pictured) both laid the foundation of the modern sugar industry.

Sugar was a luxury in Europe until the early 19th century, when it became more widely available, due to the rise of beet sugar in Prussia, and later in France under Napoleon. Beet sugar was a German invention, since, in 1747, Andreas Sigismund Marggraf announced the discovery of sugar in beets and devised a method using alcohol to extract it. Marggraf's student, Franz Karl Achard, devised an economical industrial method to extract the sugar in its pure form in the late 18th century. Achard first produced beet sugar in 1783 in Kaulsdorf. In 1801, under the patronage of King Frederick William III of Prussia (reigned 1797–1840), the world's first beet sugar production facility was established in Cunern, Silesia (then part of Prussia). While never profitable, this plant operated from 1801 until its destruction during the Napoleonic Wars (c. 1802–1815).

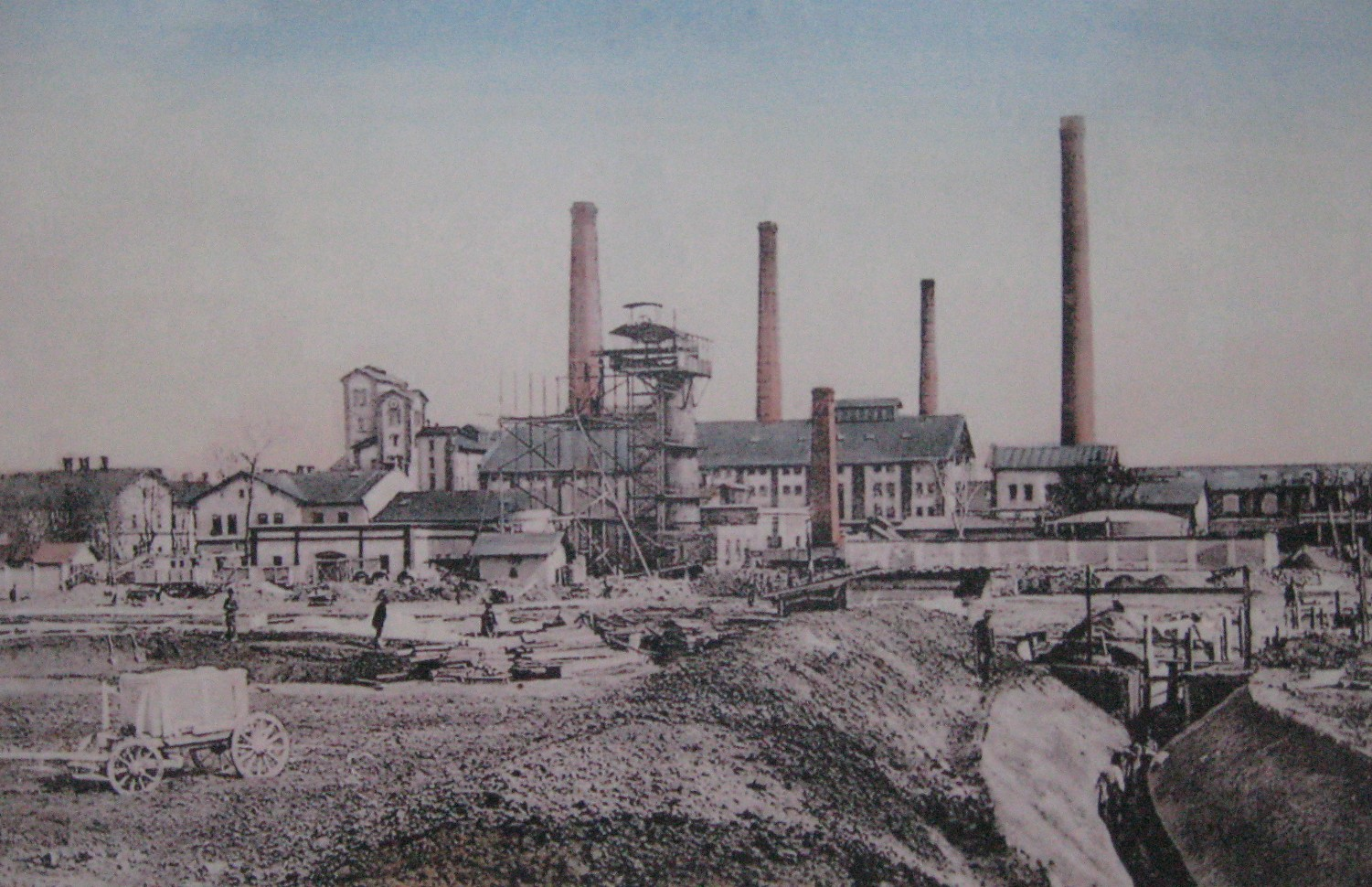
Sugar refinery in Šurany (Slovakia), founded in 1854 (picture from 1900)

The works of Marggraf and Achard were the starting point for the sugar industry in Europe, and for the modern sugar industry in general, since sugar was no longer a luxury product and a product almost only produced in warmer climates.

In France, Napoleon cut off from Caribbean imports by a British blockade, and at any rate not wanting to fund British merchants, banned imports of sugar in 1813 and ordered the planting of 32,000 hectares with beetroot. A beet sugar industry emerged, especially after Jean-Baptiste Quéruel industrialized the operation of Benjamin Delessert.

The United Kingdom Beetroot Sugar Association was established in 1832 but efforts to establish sugar beet in the UK were not very successful. Sugar beets provided approximately 2/3 of world sugar production in 1899. 46% of British sugar came from Germany and Austria. Sugar prices in Britain collapsed towards the end of the 19th century. The British Sugar Beet Society was set up in 1915 and by 1930 there were 17 factories in England and one in Scotland, supported under the provisions of the British Sugar (Subsidy) Act 1925. By 1935 homegrown sugar was 27.6% of British consumption. By 1929 109,201 people were employed in the British sugar beet industry, with about 25,000 more casual labourers.

== Mechanization ==
Beginning in the late 18th century, the production of sugar became increasingly mechanized. The steam engine first powered a sugar mill in Jamaica in 1768, and soon after, steam replaced direct firing as the source of process heat.

In 1813 the British chemist Edward Charles Howard invented a method of refining sugar that involved boiling the cane juice not in an open kettle, but in a closed vessel heated by steam and held under partial vacuum. At reduced pressure, water boils at a lower temperature, and this development both saved fuel and reduced the amount of sugar lost through caramelization. Further gains in fuel-efficiency came from the multiple-effect evaporator, designed by the United States engineer Norbert Rillieux (perhaps as early as the 1820s, although the first working model dates from 1845). This system consisted of a series of vacuum pans, each held at a lower pressure than the previous one. The vapors from each pan served to heat the next, with minimal heat wasted. Modern industries use multiple-effect evaporators for evaporating water.

The process of separating sugar from molasses also received mechanical attention: David Weston first applied the centrifuge to this task in Hawaii in 1852.

== Other sweeteners ==
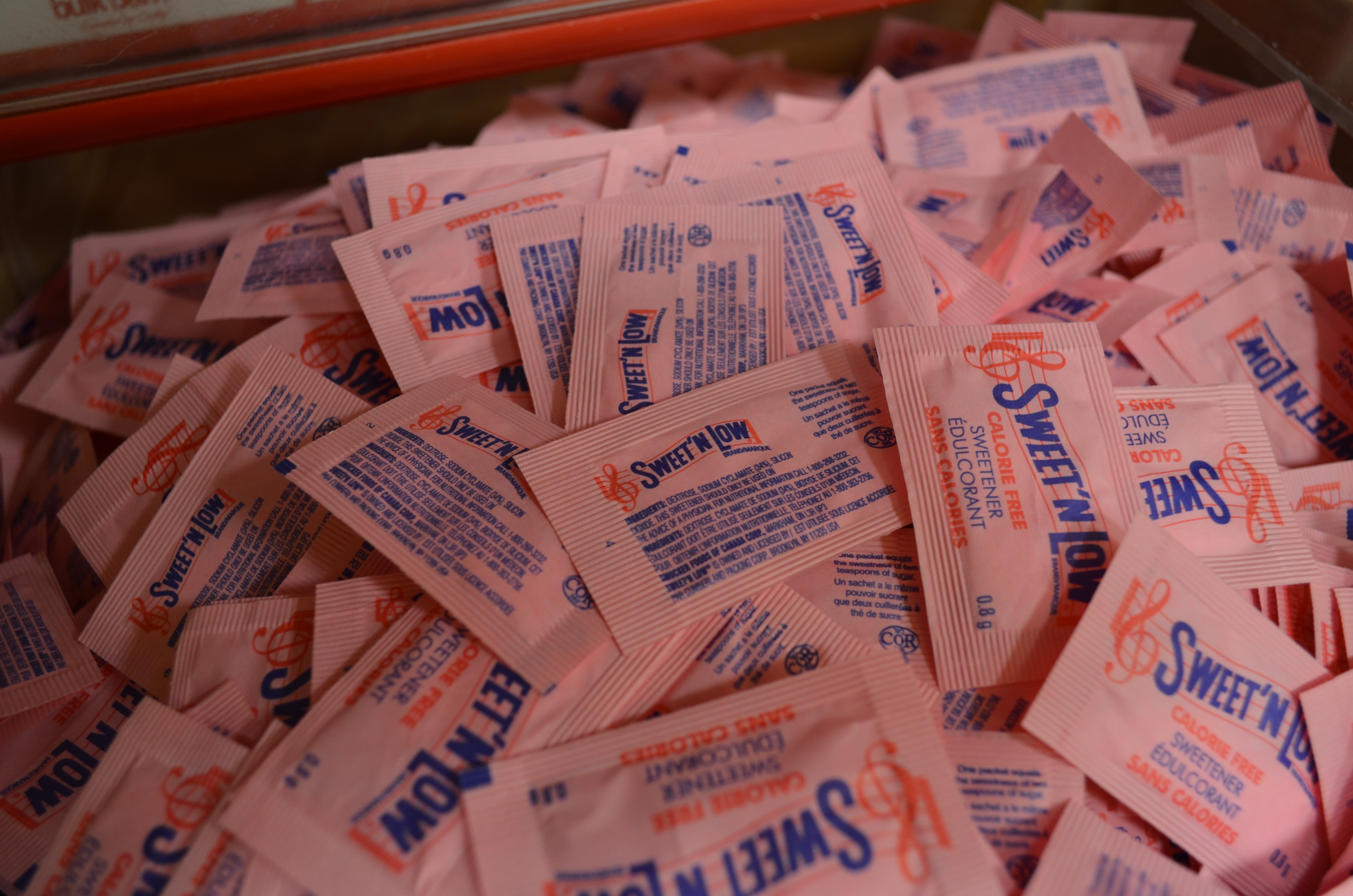
Cyclamate-based sugar substitute sold in Canada

Even after refined sugarcane became more widely available during the European colonial era, palm sugar was preferred in Java and other sugar producing parts of southeast Asia, and along with coconut sugar, is still used locally to make desserts today.

In the United States and Japan, high-fructose corn syrup (HFCS) has replaced sugar in some uses, particularly in soft drinks and processed foods. The process by which high-fructose corn syrup is produced was first developed by Richard O. Marshall and Earl R. Kooi in 1957. The industrial production process was refined by Dr. Y. Takasaki at Agency of Industrial Science and Technology of Ministry of International Trade and Industry of Japan in 1965–1970. HFCS derived from corn, is more economical because the domestic U.S. price of sugar is twice the global price. High-fructose corn syrup became an attractive substitute, and is preferred over cane sugar among the vast majority of American food and beverage manufacturers. Soft drink makers such as Coca-Cola and Pepsi use sugar in other nations, but switched to high-fructose corn syrup in the United States in 1984.

The average American consumed approximately 37.8 lb (17.1 kg) of high-fructose corn syrup in 2008, versus 46.7 lb (21.2 kg) of sucrose. Most commonly used blends of high-fructose corn syrup contain a nearly one-to-one ratio of fructose and glucose, just like common sucrose, and should therefore be metabolically identical after the first steps of sucrose metabolism, in which the sucrose is split into fructose and glucose components. At the very least, the increasing prevalence of high-fructose corn syrup has certainly led to an increase in added sugar calories in food, which may reasonably increase the incidence of obesity and other diseases.

Artificial sweeteners were introduced first as saccharine in the 1870s.

== See also ==
- Sugar Cane and Rum Museum
- Castillo Serrallés
- Hacienda Mercedita
- History of food
- Sugar industry
- Sugar Museum (Berlin)

== Bibliography ==
- Abbott, Elizabeth (2009) [2008]. Sugar: A Bittersweet History. London and New York: Duckworth Overlook. ISBN 978-0-7156-3878-1.
- Adas, Michael, ed. (2001). Agricultural and Pastoral Societies in Ancient and Classical History. Philadelphia: Temple University Press. ISBN 978-1-56639-832-9.
- Abulafia, David (2011). The Great Sea: A Human History of the Mediterranean. London: Allen Lane. ISBN 978-0-7139-9934-1.
- Benitez-Rojo, Antonio (1996) [1992]. The Repeating Island. Durham: Duke University Press. ISBN 978-0-8223-1865-1.
- Bosma, Ulbe (2023). The World of Sugar: How the Sweet Stuff Transformed Our Politics, Health, and Environment over 2,000 Years. Cambridge: The Belknap Press of Harvard University Press. ISBN 9780674279391.
- Bernstein, William (2009) [2008]. A Splendid Exchange: How Trade Shaped the World. London: Atlantic Books. ISBN 9781843548034.
- Collino, M (June 2011). "High dietary fructose intake: Sweet or bitter life?". World J Diabetes. 2 (6): 77–81. doi:10.4239/wjd.v2.i6.77. PMC 3158875. PMID 21860690.
- Kieschnick, John (2003). The Impact of Buddhism on Chinese Material Culture. Princeton: University Press. ISBN 978-0-691-09676-6.
- Marshall, RO; Kooi, ER (April 1957). "Enzymatic conversion of D-glucose to D-fructose". Science. 125 (3249): 648–9. Bibcode:1957Sci...125..648M. doi:10.1126/science.125.3249.648. PMID 13421660.
- Mintz, Sidney Wilfred (1986) [1985]. Sweetness and Power: The Place of Sugar in Modern History. London: Penguin. ISBN 978-0-14-009233-2.
- Parker, Matthew (2011). The Sugar Barons: Family, Corruption, Empire and War. London: Hutchinson. ISBN 978-0-09-192583-3.
- Ponting, Clive (2000). World History: A New Perspective. London: Chatto & Windus. ISBN 978-0-7011-6834-6.
- Samuel, VT (February 2011). "Fructose induced lipogenesis: from sugar to fat to insulin resistance". Trends Endocrinol Metab. 22 (2): 60–65. doi:10.1016/j.tem.2010.10.003. PMID 21067942. S2CID 33205288.
- Sato, Tsugitaka (2014). Sugar in the Social Life of Medieval Islam. BRILL. ISBN 9789004277526.
- Sen, Tansen (2003). Buddhism, Diplomacy, and Trade: The Realignment of Sino-Indian Relations, 600–1400. Manoa: Asian Interactions and Comparisons, a joint publication of the University of Hawaii Press and the Association for Asian Studies. ISBN 978-0-8248-2593-5.
- Sharpe, Peter (1998). Sugar Cane: Past and Present. Illinois: Southern Illinois University. Archived from the original on 2008-05-18.
- Singerman, David (2025). Unrefined: How Capitalism Reinvented Sugar. Chicago, IL: University of Chicago Press. ISBN 9780226837376.
- Srinivasan, T.M. (2016). "Agricultural Practices as gleaned from the Tamil Literature of the Sangam Age" (PDF). Indian Journal of History of Science. 51 (2). doi:10.16943/ijhs/2016/v51i2/48430.
- Von Sivers, Peter; Desnoyers, Charles; Stow, George B.; Perry, Jonathan Scott (2018). Patterns of world history with sources. Vol. 2 (Third ed.). New York, NY: Oxford University Press. ISBN 978-0190693619. LCCN 2017005347.
- Sugar: The Most Evil Molecule from Science History Institute
- Watts, Sheldon J (April 2001). "Yellow Fever Immunities in West Africa and the Americas in the Age of Slavery and Beyond: A Reappraisal". Journal of Social History. 34 (4): 955–967. doi:10.1353/jsh.2001.0071. PMID 17595747. S2CID 31836946.
- Widiantara, et al. "Heritage and identity: The vernacular transformation of De Tjolomadoe." Journal of City: Branding and Authenticity, vol. 2, no. 1, 31 July 2024, https://doi.org/10.61511/jcbau.v2i1.2024.913.
- Wilson, C Anne (2011) [1985]. The Book of Marmalade. Oakville, CT: David Brown Book Company. ISBN 978-1-903018-77-4.
- Wood, Peter H (1996) [1974]. Black Majority: Negroes in Colonial South Carolina from 1670 through the Stono Rebellion. New York: Norton. ISBN 978-0-393-31482-3.
