= Dactylispa bakeri =

Scientific classification
- Kingdom: Animalia
- Phylum: Arthropoda
- Clade: Pancrustacea
- Class: Insecta
- Order: Coleoptera
- Suborder: Polyphaga
- Infraorder: Cucujiformia
- Family: Chrysomelidae
- Genus: Dactylispa
- Species: D. bakeri

Binomial name
- Dactylispa bakeri (Gestro, 1917)

Synonyms
- Triplispa bakeri Gestro, 1917

Species of beetle

Dactylispa bakeri is a species of beetle of the family Chrysomelidae. It is found in Indonesia (Java) and the Philippines (Mindanao, Palawan).

== Life history ==
The recorded host plant for this species is Saccharum spontaneum.
