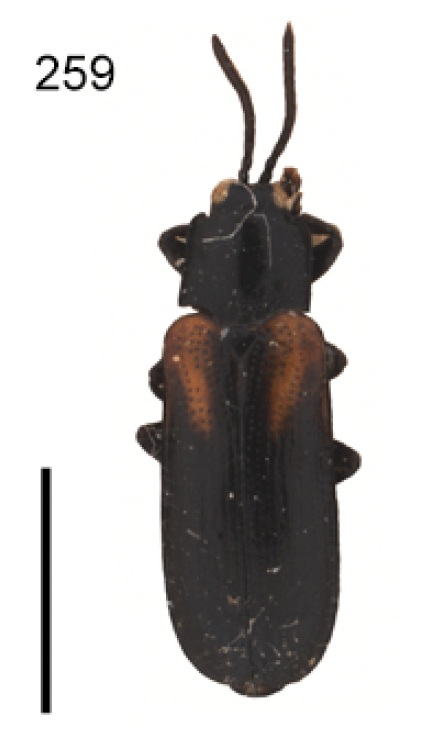

Scientific classification
- Kingdom: Animalia
- Phylum: Arthropoda
- Class: Insecta
- Order: Coleoptera
- Suborder: Polyphaga
- Infraorder: Cucujiformia
- Family: Chrysomelidae
- Genus: Cephaloleia
- Species: C. tucumana

Binomial name
- Cephaloleia tucumana Weise, 1904

Synonyms
- Cephaloleia saccharina Maulik, 1929

= Cephaloleia tucumana =

Species of beetle

Cephaloleia tucumana is a species of beetle of the family Chrysomelidae. It is found in Costa Rica, Nicaragua and Panama.

== Description ==
Adults reach a length of about 5–6.5 mm. Adults are black, with the basal one-third of the elytron and elytral margin reddish-yellow. The pronotal margin is weakly reddish.

== Biology ==
The recorded host plants are Canna species, Cephaloleia denudata, Cephaloleia glauca, Saccharum officinarum and Panicum grumosum.
