= Palmira, Valle del Cauca =

Palmira
- Municipality and city
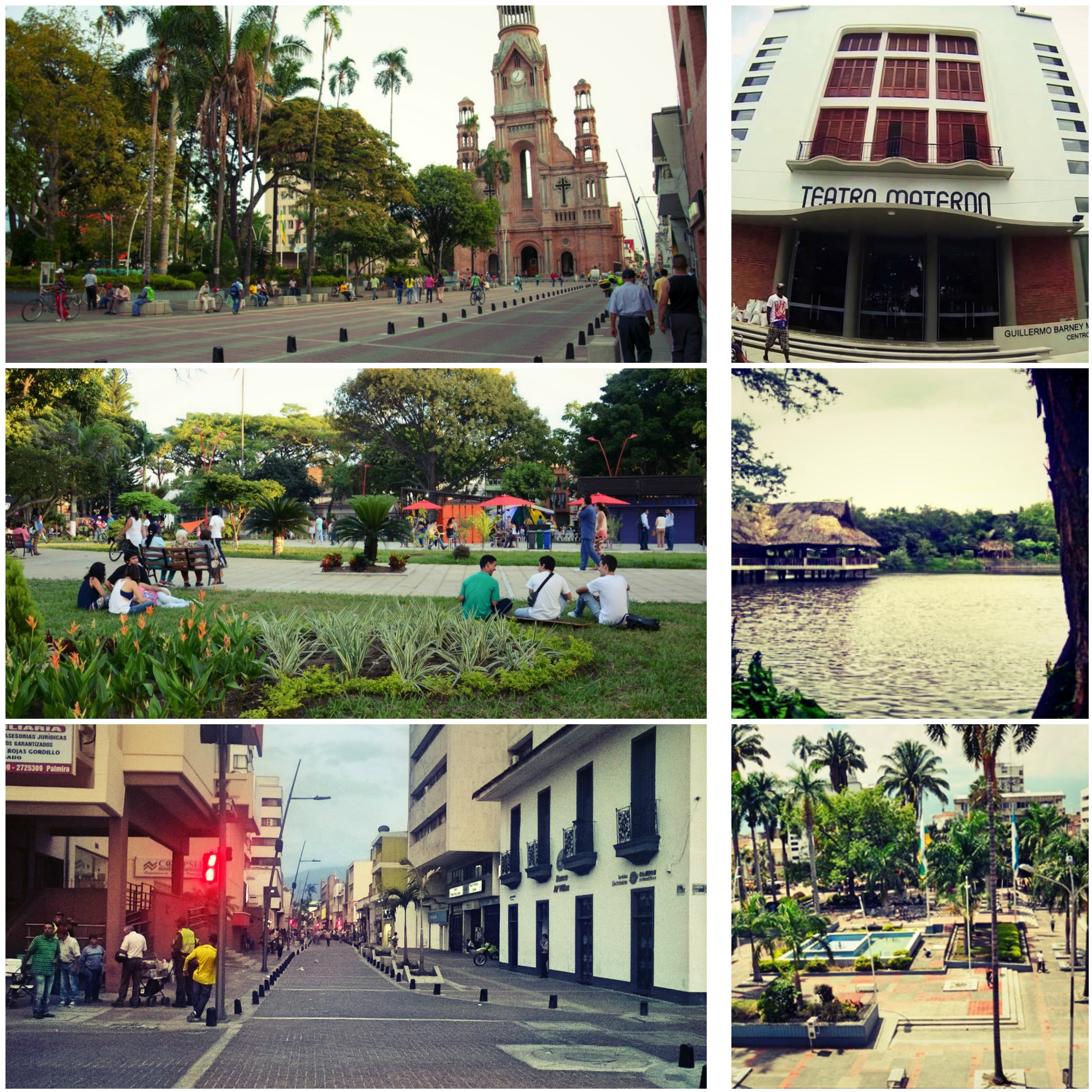
- Palmira, Valle del Cauca, Colombia

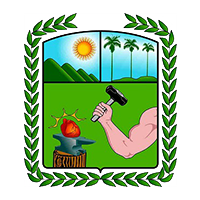
- Flag Coat of arms

- Location of the municipality and city of Palmira in the Valle del Cauca Department.

- Location within Colombia
- Coordinates: 3°35′N 76°15′W
- Country: Colombia
- Region: Andean Region
- Department: Valle del Cauca^{*}
- Founded: 1824

Government
  - Type: Mayor–council
  - Body: Alcaldía de Palmira
  - Mayor: Oscar Escobar

Area
  - Municipality and city: 1,005 km^{2} (388 sq mi)
  - Urban: 24.6 km^{2} (9.5 sq mi)
- Elevation: 1,001 m (3,284 ft)

Population (2020 est.)
  - Municipality and city: 354,285
  - Density: 352.5/km^{2} (913.0/sq mi)
  - Urban: 279,465
  - Urban density: 11,400/km^{2} (29,400/sq mi)
- Demonym: Palmirano
- Postal code: 76520000
- Area code: 57 + 2
- Website: Official website (in Spanish)

Palmira is a city and municipality in southwestern Colombia in the Valle del Cauca Department. Situated approximately 27 kilometres (17 mi) east of Cali, the department's capital, Palmira is the second largest city in the department behind Cali, with a population of over 354,000 (2020 est.).

Palmira's contribution to agribusiness has earned it the title of Colombia's agricultural capital, with companies such as Manuelita, Providencia Sugar Mill and Del Cauca Sugar Mill all based in the city. In addition to sugarcane, the city and surrounding area also produces coffee, rice, corn and tobacco.

== Geography ==
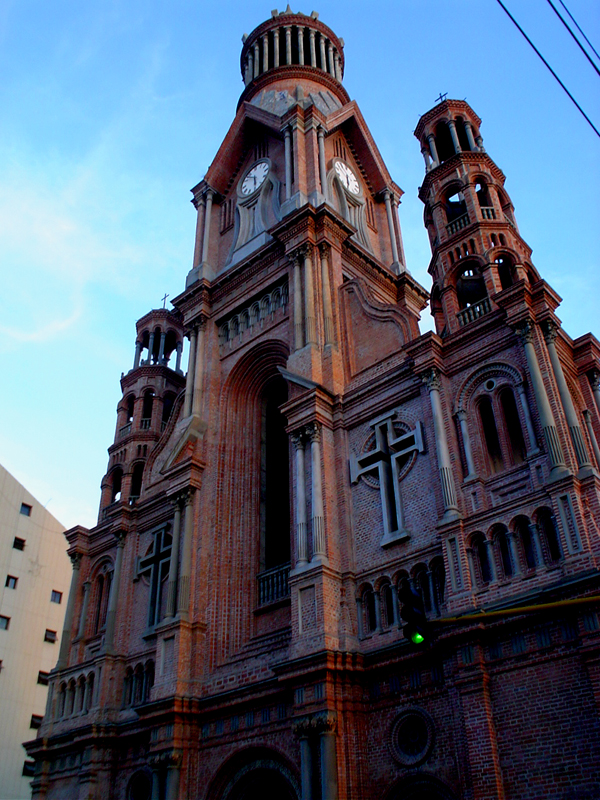
Cathedral.

Palmira is located in southwestern Colombia, lying in the Cauca River valley. 3°31’48” north altitude and 76°81’13” longitude west of Greenwich. The city covers an area of 1,160 km^{2} (448 sq mi). The city lies at an elevation of 1,000 m (3,300 ft) above sea level.

=== Climate ===
Palmira has a relatively dry tropical savanna climate (Köppen Aw) with two dry seasons: from June to August and December to February. Annual rainfall averages only about 900 millimetres or 35 inches at the airport, but up to 1,700 millimetres or 67 inches in higher parts of the municipality.

Climate data for Palmira (Palmira Ica), elevation 1,050 m (3,440 ft), (1981–2010)
Month	Jan	Feb	Mar	Apr	May	Jun	Jul	Aug	Sep	Oct	Nov	Dec	Year
Mean daily maximum °C (°F)	29.6 (85.3)	29.9 (85.8)	29.6 (85.3)	29.3 (84.7)	29.0 (84.2)	29.1 (84.4)	29.9 (85.8)	30.2 (86.4)	29.8 (85.6)	29.0 (84.2)	28.7 (83.7)	28.9 (84.0)	29.4 (84.9)
Daily mean °C (°F)	23.6 (74.5)	23.9 (75.0)	23.9 (75.0)	23.6 (74.5)	23.6 (74.5)	23.4 (74.1)	23.8 (74.8)	24.0 (75.2)	23.8 (74.8)	23.3 (73.9)	23.1 (73.6)	23.3 (73.9)	23.6 (74.5)
Mean daily minimum °C (°F)	19.1 (66.4)	19.3 (66.7)	19.4 (66.9)	19.5 (67.1)	19.5 (67.1)	19.1 (66.4)	18.8 (65.8)	18.9 (66.0)	19.0 (66.2)	19.0 (66.2)	19.0 (66.2)	19.1 (66.4)	19.1 (66.4)
Average precipitation mm (inches)	59.0 (2.32)	74.8 (2.94)	114.0 (4.49)	159.0 (6.26)	110.1 (4.33)	59.8 (2.35)	35.2 (1.39)	39.2 (1.54)	82.1 (3.23)	113.2 (4.46)	133.1 (5.24)	88.2 (3.47)	1,067.6 (42.03)
Average precipitation days	9	9	14	16	16	10	8	8	11	15	16	12	143
Average relative humidity (%)	76	75	77	79	79	78	75	73	75	77	79	78	77
Mean monthly sunshine hours	167.4	149.6	142.6	132.0	133.3	141.0	173.6	173.6	147.0	145.7	144.0	161.2	1,811
Mean daily sunshine hours	5.4	5.3	4.6	4.4	4.3	4.7	5.6	5.6	4.9	4.7	4.8	5.2	5.0
Source: Instituto de Hidrologia Meteorologia y Estudios Ambientales

== Industry ==
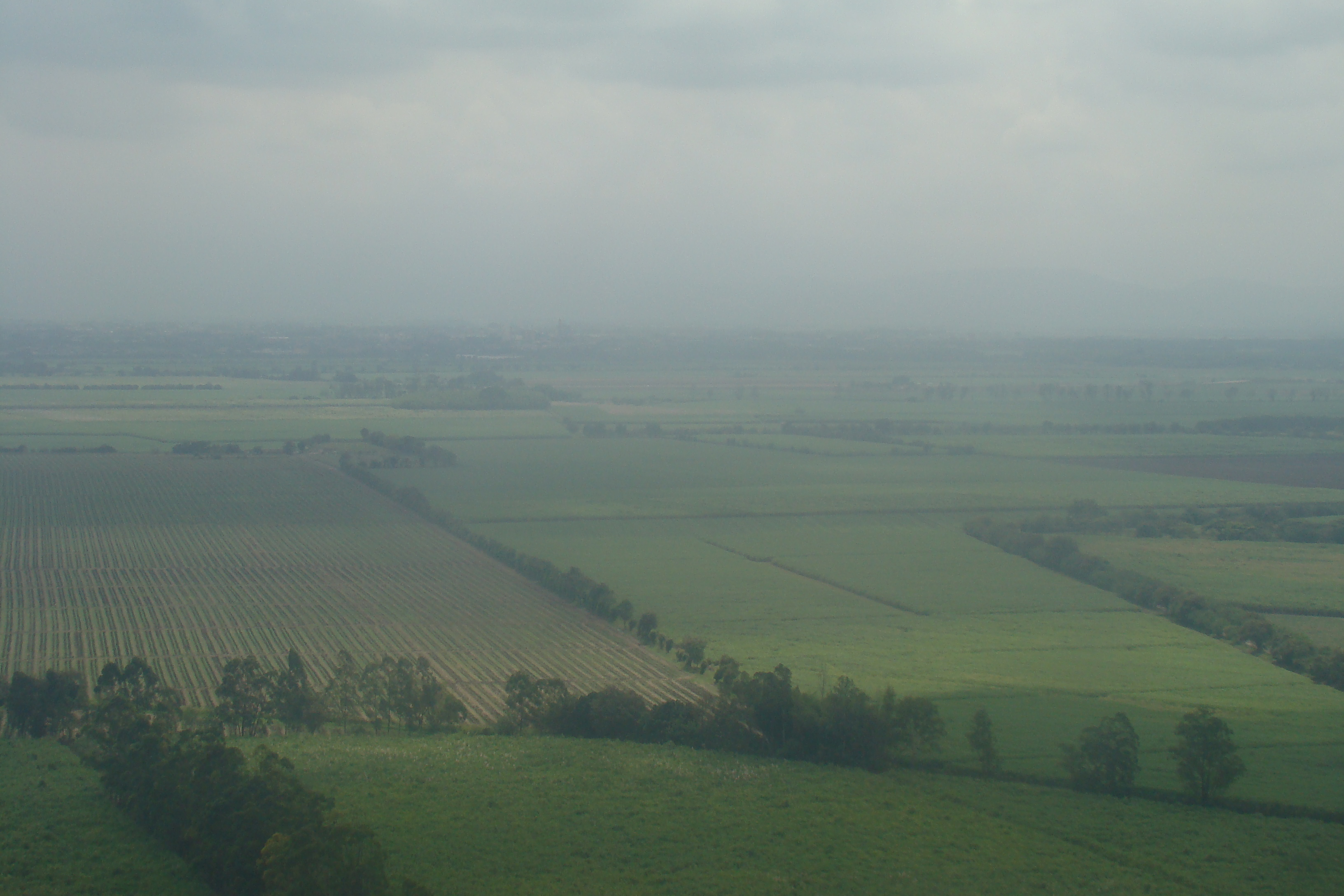
Sugar cane plantations.

Important agricultural products are sugar cane, coffee, rice, corn, and tobacco. Palmira is known as the agricultural capital of Colombia, its main source of income is agriculture and specially the sugarcane cultivation. Palmira is home to the most important sugar mills in the country like : Manuelita Sugar Mill, Providencia Sugar Mill, Del Cauca Sugar Mill and more. The illegal burning of waste cane is the main source of air pollution in the city.

In 2005, Palmira opened its first large and post modern shopping mall Centro Comercial Llanogrande Plaza, popularly called "La Catorce", after the department store 'La 14' located in the mall. In 2021 'La 14' liquidated and all locations closed, including the store in Llanogrande. The indoor/outdoor shopping center has become very popular among Palmireños since its opening as there were until recently no other large shopping malls in the city. Nevertheless, Palmiranos can still do their basic shopping in La Marden or any of its other stores located all throughout the city, specially in El Centro. Before the mall was built, Palmireños had to travel to Cali to many of its shopping centers such as La Catorce, De Calima, and Chipichape. Llanogrande has many restaurants, several outdoor bars, an indoor cinema, casino, and a small amusement park. It is located on the city's southwest side. In 2014, a second commercial shopping center called "Unicentro Palmira" was opened on the north west side of the city.

== Transportation ==
Alfonso Bonilla Aragón International Airport, which serves Cali, is located in Palmira. The citizens' most common method of transportation is the motorcycle. There are many of these in the city and many operators ignore traffic laws so that cars on the street have to drive slow and carefully in order to avoid hitting them. In fact, the large numbers of motorcycles has become a new business since the past 5 years. Since there are a lot of motorcycles, their owners have started to offer transporting people from one place to other as if they were taxis. This caused a lot of friction between taxis and "mototaxis", as many people call them, because it has reduced the demand of people willing to pay for the cost of a taxi. Another method of transportation that is very common, but mostly used as attractive complement to the colonial architecture, are the white carriages which tourists can pay for to have a tour of the city. The city recently began municipal bus service under the name TUPAL that utilize natural gas powered buses.

== Education ==
Palmira is also famous for having many colleges, this has led it to be called "The University City". The following universities are located in Palmira.

- University of Valle (univalle). The university is the principal higher education institution in the South West of Colombia. It has the third highest number of students in Colombia. The university has 4 campuses, with one of them located in Palmira. The University of Valle has 30,000 students, of which 25,000 are undergraduate and 5,000 are postgraduate students. The campus at the city of Palmira is located in La Carbonera sector between the Carrera 31 and the La Carbonera Avenue, on 5 hectares (12 1/2 acres) of land donated by the sugar mill company Manuelita S.A.. The project was completed in three stages, the first phase started on June 15, 2007, and was inaugurated on June 11, 2009, correspond to a three-story building with a surface area of 5.2 hectares (12 7/8 acres), with a cost of $6 billion COP. The new building has a library, five laboratories for chemistry, biology, electronics, physics, and food analysis; an auditorium for 150 spectators, and 27 class rooms with Internet access. The second and third planned phases for the first stage are the construction of a similar building and an auditorium for 1,500 spectators.
- National University of Colombia (Sede Palmira). The university is a public, national, coeducational, research university located primarily in Bogota, Medellin, Palmira and Manizales. Established in 1867 by an act of Congress, the university is the largest higher education institution in Colombia with more than 44,000 students, with the largest number of graduated professionals and a total of 430 academic programmes available for tuition. It is also one of the few universities that employs post=doctorate fellows in the country. The National University is widely known as the best Colombian University, and one of the best universities in Latin America, for its high degree of education and research achievement.

=== Private Universities ===
- Pontifical Bolivarian University
- Universidad Antonio Nariño
- University of Santiago de Cali (USC)
- Corporación Universitaria Remington
- Fundación Universitaria San Martín

== Sports ==
Four professional football teams have represented the city in the Categoría Primera B, Colombia's second-tier football league: Expreso Palmira and Palmira F.C. played in the competition for three years each, and Univalle and Deportes Palmira represented the city in one season each. Currently Orsomarso and Internacional F.C. de Palmira represent the city. There is also a futsal team, which is called Club de Palmira Fut-Salón. Success wise, women's football has contributed the most. Amateur local team Generaciones Palmiranas is one of the best teams in the country and regularly sends its players to form part of the women's national squad. Orsomarso has also fielded a women's team that has competed in the professional league.

=== Stadiums ===
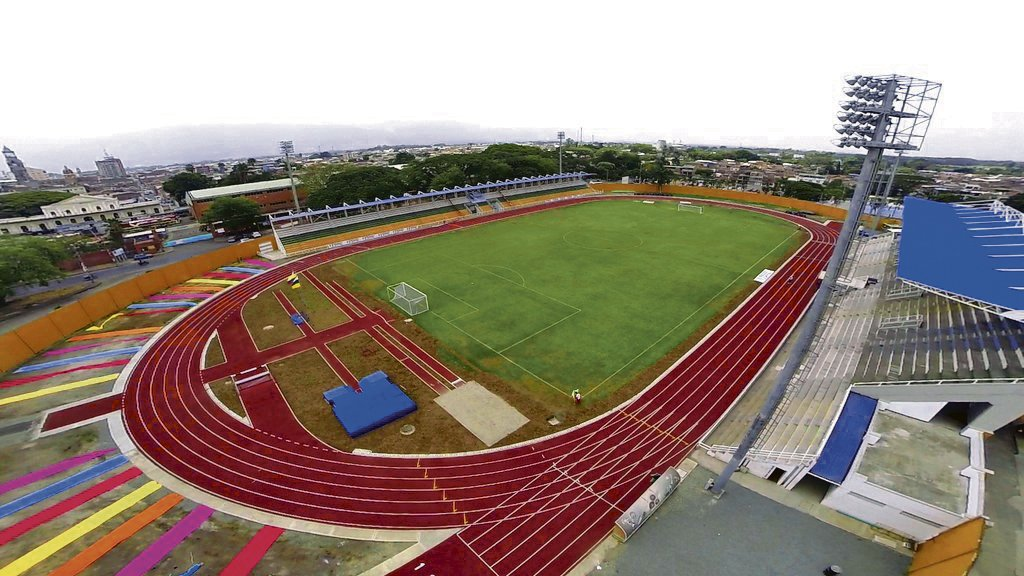
Estadio Francisco Rivera Escobar.

Estadio Francisco Rivera Escobar is a stadium located in the centre of Palmira, built in the 1950s. In 2015 the stadium was renovated, with new stadium lights and a running track around the football pitch. This has allowed the city to host athletic events. The stadium has been used by América de Cali as an alternate home stadium when Estadio Pascual Guerrero has been unavailable, the last time of which was in 2011. It is now used by Orsomarso and Internacional F.C. de Palmira to host their home matches.

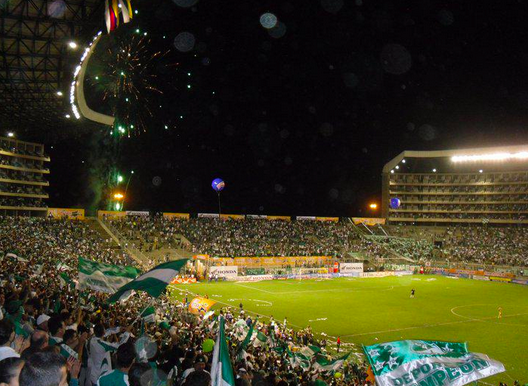
Estadio Deportivo Cali.

Estadio Deportivo Cali is a football stadium built on the outskirts of Palmira, situated on the main highway that links Palmira with Cali. It is the official stadium of Deportivo Cali who play in the first division Categoría Primera A. Deportivo Cali are one of the most successful teams in Colombia, having won ten league championships. The stadium was inaugurated in February 2010, and is one of the largest stadiums in Colombia as well as the first stadium owned by a professional football club in the country.

== Notable people ==
- Esmeralda Arboleda Cadavid, a politician who became the first female Senator in Colombian history.
- Mireya Arboleda, a classical pianist and Esmeralda's sister.
- Claudia Palacios, a journalist and newscaster, lived in Palmira until she was 15 years old. She now works for CNN en Español in Atlanta, Georgia and resides there with her son Pablo.
- Santiago Eder, 19th century industrial pioneer and founder of Manuelita sugar mill.
- Elizabeth Eder de Zobel de Ayala wife of Filipino billionaire Jaime Augusto Zobel de Ayala Miranda whose cousin is Inigo Zobel de Ayala Urquijo, owner of Sotogrande in Andalucia, Spain and grandson of Juan Urquijo, former owner of Banco Urquijo
- Hélmer Herrera, drug trafficker. High-ranking member of the Cali Cartel
