= Sucrose phosphorylase =

Class of enzymes

- Sucrose phosphorylase homodimer, Bifidobacterium adolescentis

Identifiers
- EC no.: 2.4.1.7
- CAS no.: 9074-06-0

Databases
- IntEnz: IntEnz view
- BRENDA: BRENDA entry
- ExPASy: NiceZyme view
- KEGG: KEGG entry
- MetaCyc: metabolic pathway
- PRIAM: profile
- PDB structures: RCSB PDB PDBe PDBsum
Search
- PMC: articles
- PubMed: articles
- NCBI: proteins

Sucrose phosphorylase (EC 2.4.1.7) is an important enzyme in the metabolism of sucrose and regulation of other metabolic intermediates. Sucrose phosphorylase is in the class of hexosyltransferases. More specifically it has been placed in the retaining glycoside hydrolases family although it catalyzes a transglycosidation rather than hydrolysis. Sucrose phosphorylase catalyzes the conversion of sucrose to D-fructose and α-D-glucose-1-phosphate. It has been shown in multiple experiments that the enzyme catalyzes this conversion by a double displacement mechanism.

== Reaction ==
The method by which sucrose phosphorylase converts sucrose to D-fructose and alpha-D-glucose-1-phosphate has been studied in great detail. In the reaction, sucrose binds to the enzyme, at which point fructose is released by the enzyme-substrate complex. A covalent glucose-enzyme complex results, with beta-linkage between an oxygen atom in the carboxyl group of an aspartyl residue and C-1 of glucose. The covalent complex was experimentally isolated by chemical modification of the protein using NaIO_{4} after addition of the substrate, supporting the hypothesis that reaction catalyzed by sucrose phosphorylase proceeds through the ping-pong mechanism. In the final enzymatic step, the glycosidic bond is cleaved through reaction with a phosphate group (P_{i}), yielding α-D-glucose-1-phosphate.

sucrose
P_{i}
P_{i}
keto-D-fructose
+
α-D-glucose 1-phosphate

In a separate reaction, α-D-glucose-1-phosphate is converted to glucose 6-phosphate by the action of phosphoglucomutase. Glucose-6-phosphate is an extremely important intermediate for several pathways in the human body, including glycolysis, gluconeogenesis, and the pentose phosphate pathway. The function of sucrose phosphorylase is especially significant due to the role α-D-glucose-1-phosphate in energy metabolism.

== Structure ==
The structure of sucrose phosphorylase has been identified in numerous experiments. The enzyme consists of four major domains, namely A, B, B’, and C. Domains A, B’ and C exist as dimers around the active site. The size of the enzyme, as determined by sedimentation centrifugation, was found to be 55 KDa, consisting of 488 amino acids. The active has been shown to contain two binding sites, one designated a water site where hydroxylic molecules such as 1,2-cyclohexanediol and ethylene glycol may bind, and another designated as the acceptor site where the sugar molecule binds. Though the function of the water site has not been completely elucidated, the enzyme's stability in aqueous solutions indicates that the water site may be involved in hydrolysis of the glycosidic bond.

The acceptor site is surrounded by three active residues that have been found to be essential in enzymatic activity. Using specific mutagenic assays, Asp-192 was found to be the catalytic nucleophile of the enzyme, “attacking C-1 of the glucosyl moiety of sucrose”. In fact, in vitro manipulation has shown that D-xylose, L-sorbose, and L-arabinose can replace fructose as the glucosyl acceptor. The only requirement of the acceptor molecule is that the hydroxyl group on the C-3 be cis-disposed to the oxygen atom of the glycosidic bond. Glu-232 acts as the Bronsted acid-base catalyst, donating a proton to the displaced hydroxyl group on C-1 of the glucoside.

The most significant residue in the enzymatic activity, however, is Asp-295. Upon cleavage of the fructofuranosyl moiety from sucrose, the resultant glucose forms a covalent intermediate with the enzyme. The carboxylate side chain of Asp-295 hydrogen bonds with the hydroxyl groups at C-2 and C-3 of the glucosyl residue. This interaction is maximized during the transition state of this covalent complex, lending support to the ping-pong mechanism. Finally, phosphorylation of the glucosyl residue at C-1 forms a transient positive charge on the glucosyl carbon, promoting breakage of the ester bond between Asp-192 and the sugar residue. Cleavage yields the product, α-D-glucose-1-phosphate.

== Regulation ==
Since the discovery and characterization of sucrose phosphorylase, few documented experiments discuss mechanisms of regulation for the enzyme. The known methods of regulation are transcriptional, affecting the amount of enzyme present at any given time.

Global regulation of DNA molecules containing the gene for sucrose phosphorylase is performed by catabolite repression. First discovered in Gram-negative bacteria, both Cyclic AMP (cAMP) and cAMP Receptor Protein (CRP) function in sucrose phosphorylase regulation. The cAMP-CRP complex formed when both molecules combine acts as a positive regulator for transcription of the sucrose phosphorylase gene. The complex binds to the promoter region to activate transcription, enhancing the creation of sucrose phosphorylase.

Genetic regulation of sucrose phosphorylase is also performed by metabolites. Through experimentation it is known that genes encoding for the sucrose phosphorylase enzyme can be induced by sucrose and raffinose. Glucose, on the other hand, represses the transcription of the sucrose phosphorylase gene. These metabolites undoubtedly function in this way because of their implications in cellular metabolism.

There has been little research on methods of the allosteric regulation of sucrose phosphorylase, so at this point the function of allosteric molecules can only be hypothesized. Due to the nature of its function in metabolic pathways, it is likely that sucrose phosphorylase is additionally regulated by other common metabolites. For example, the presence of ATP would probably inhibit sucrose phosphorylase since ATP is a product of the catabolic pathway. Conversely, ADP would likely stimulate sucrose phosphorylase to increase levels of ATP. Further research on the subject would be required to support or refute these ideas.

== Function ==
As mentioned above, sucrose phosphorylase is a very important enzyme in metabolism. The reaction catalyzed by sucrose phosphorylase produces the valuable byproducts α-D-glucose-1-phosphate and fructose. α-D-glucose-1-phosphate can be reversibly converted by phosphoglucomutase to glucose-6-phosphate, which is an important intermediate used in glycolysis. In addition, fructose can be reversibly converted into fructose 6-phosphate, also found in the glycolytic pathway. In fact, fructose-6-phosphate and glucose-6-phosphate can be interconverted in the glycolytic pathway by phosphohexose isomerase. The final product of glycolysis, pyruvate, has multiple implications in metabolism. During anaerobic conditions, pyruvate con be converted into either lactate or ethanol, depending on the organism, providing a quick source of energy. In aerobic conditions, pyruvate can be converted into Acetyl-CoA, which has many possible fates including catabolism in the Citric Acid Cycle for energy use and anabolism in the formation of fatty acids for energy storage. Through these reactions, sucrose phosphorylase becomes important in the regulation of metabolic functions.

The regulation of sucrose phosphorylase can also be used to explain its function in terms of energy consumption and preservation. The cAMP-CRP complex that enhances transcription of the sucrose phosphorylase gene (Reid and Abratt 2003) is only present when glucose levels are low. The purpose of sucrose phosphorylase, therefore, can be linked to the need for higher glucose levels, created through its reaction. The fact that glucose acts as a feedback inhibitor to prevent the formation of sucrose phosphorylase further supports its catalytic role in the creation of glucose for energy use or storage.

The glucose-6-phosphate molecule created from the original α-D-glucose-1-phosphate product is also involved in the pentose phosphate pathway. Through a series of reactions, glucose-6-phosphate can be converted into ribose-5-phosphate, which is used for a variety of molecules such as nucleotides, coenzymes, DNA, and RNA. These connections reveal that sucrose phosphorylase is also important for the regulation of other cellular molecules.
