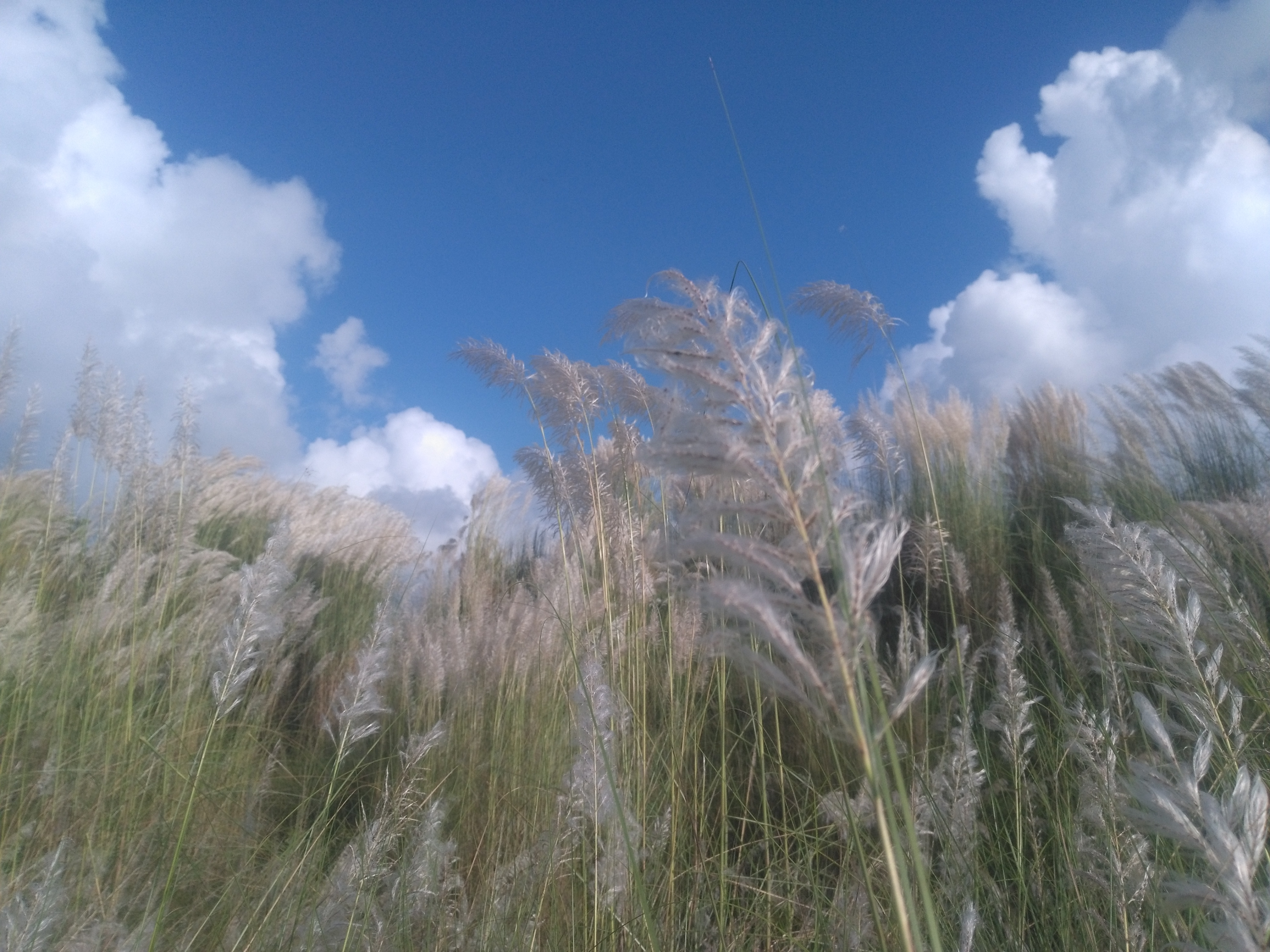

Conservation status
- Least Concern (IUCN 3.1)

Scientific classification
- Kingdom: Plantae
- Clade: Embryophytes
- Clade: Tracheophytes
- Clade: Spermatophytes
- Clade: Angiosperms
- Clade: Monocots
- Clade: Commelinids
- Order: Poales
- Family: Poaceae
- Subfamily: Panicoideae
- Genus: Saccharum
- Species: S. spontaneum

Binomial name
- Saccharum spontaneum L.

= Saccharum spontaneum =

Kans grass

Species of plant

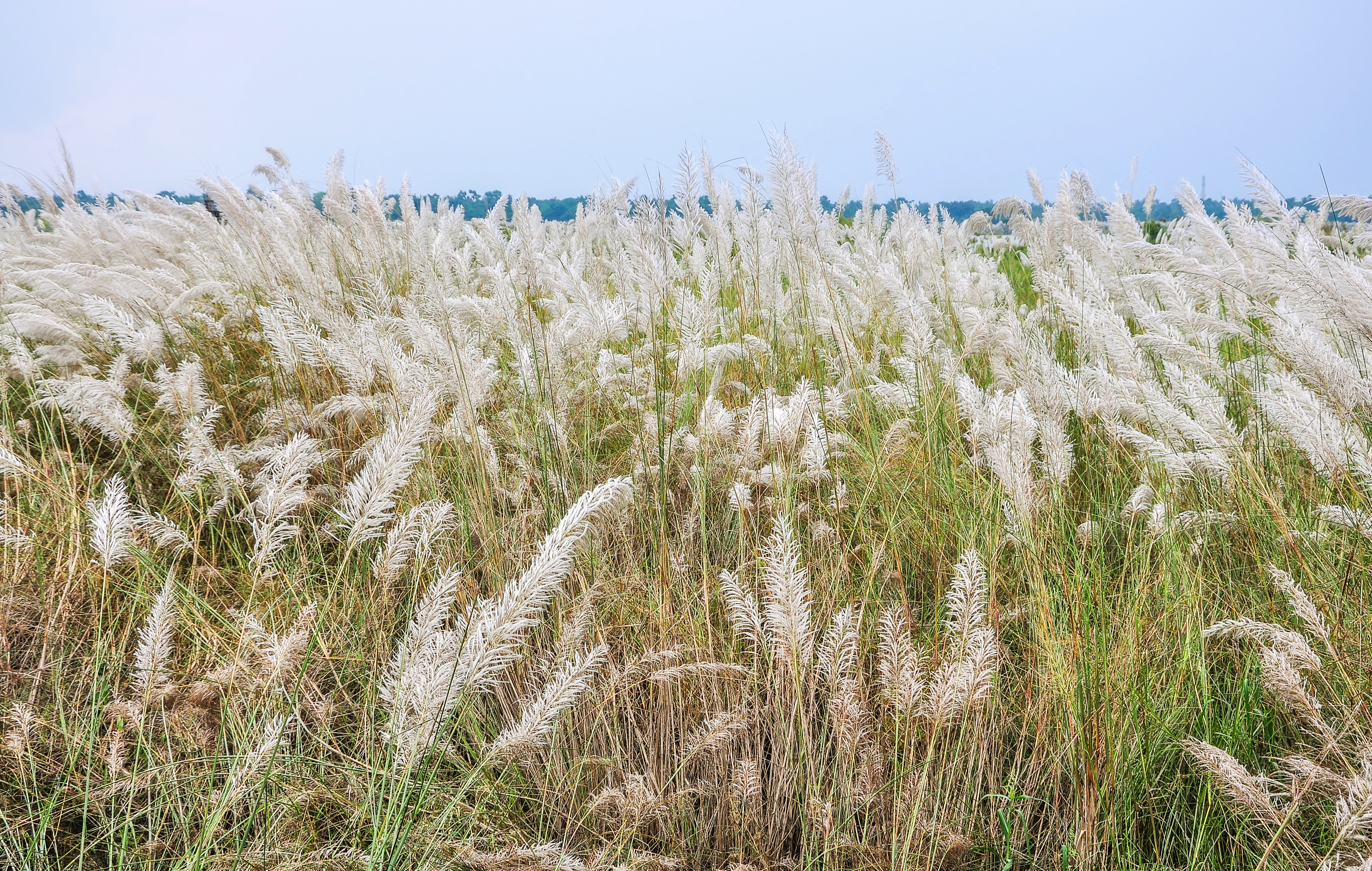
Kans grass (Saccharum spontaneum)

Saccharum spontaneum (wild sugarcane, kans grass) is a grass native throughout much of tropical and subtropical Asia, northern Australia, and eastern and northern Africa. It is a perennial grass, growing up to three meters in height, with spreading rhizomatous roots.

The plant has hybridized with Saccharum officinarum, a domesticated sugarcane. The hybridization has produced Saccharum barberi and Saccharum sinense.

== See also ==
- Domesticated plants and animals of Austronesia
