= James Martin Eder =

Colombian businessman

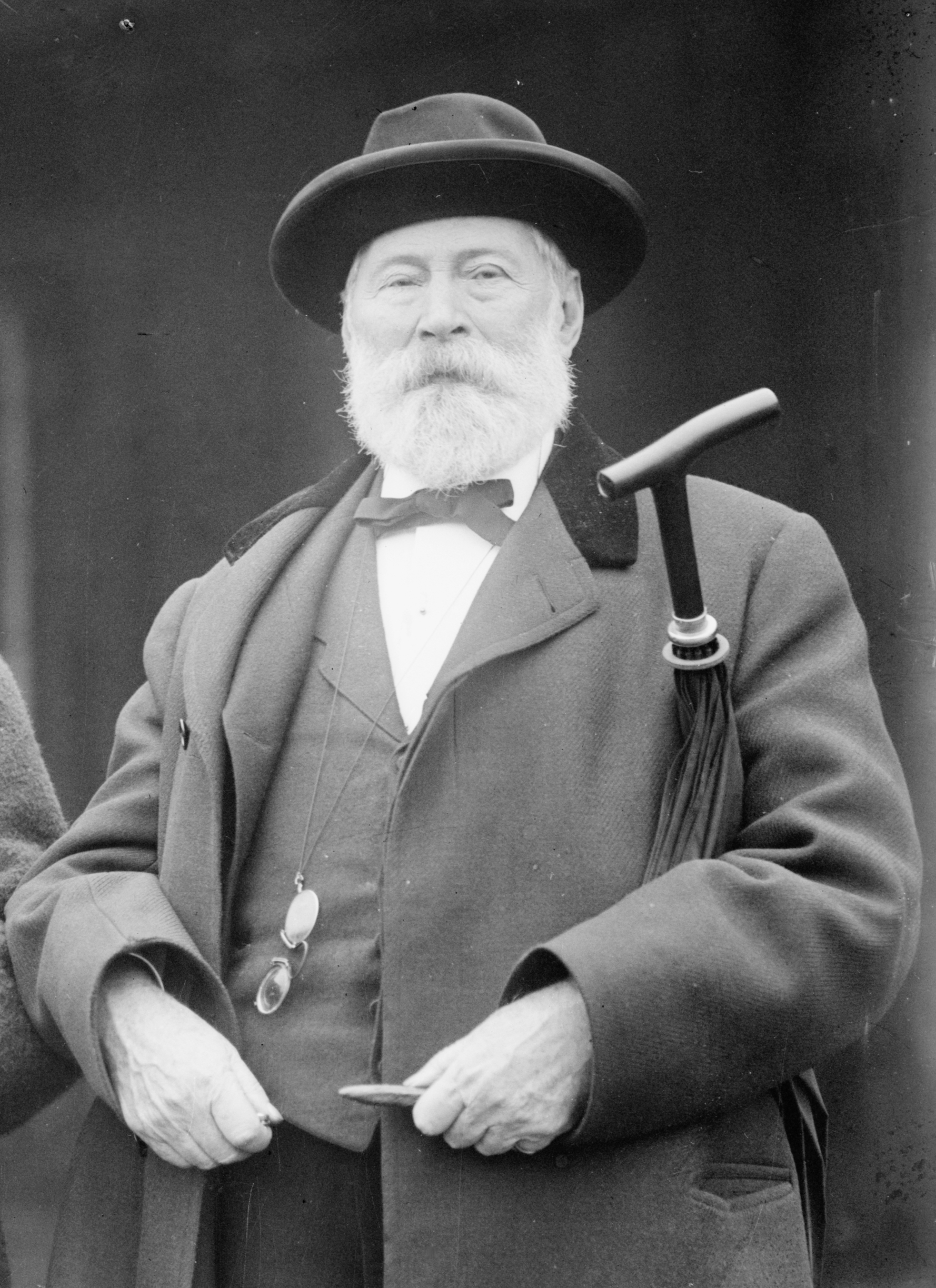
- 1913
- Born: James Martin Eder; June 24, 1838; Jelgava, Russian Empire
- Died: December 26, 1921 (aged 83); Washington, D.C., U.S.
- Other name: Santiago Martín Eder Kaiser
- Known for: Founder of Manuelita
- Spouse: Elizabeth Benjamin

James Martin Eder (June 24, 1838 – December 26, 1921), known in Colombia as Santiago Martín Eder Kaiser, don Santiago Eder or simply "El Fundador", was a Russian-American-Colombian businessman who is considered the pioneer of Colombia's sugar industry, and is widely recognized as one of that country's leading 19th-century industrial pioneers.

== Early life ==
Eder was born to a Lithuanian Jewish family in Goldingen in the Courland Governorate in the Russian Empire. He was the son of Martin Sass Eder and Dorina Kaiser, and was the youngest of their seven children. In 1851 Santiago Eder immigrated from Courland to New York City where his older brother and most of his siblings already lived. He completed his education and after some work experience entered Harvard Law School in 1858. In 1861 he moved to San Francisco, and from there moved to the Colombian sea port of Buenaventura where he worked as a lawyer and a commercial representative for Panamanian trading firms when Panama was still part of Colombia. In 1864 he bought the Manuelita sugar and coffee farm near the city of Palmira in the Cauca Valley of Colombia. He bought this farm at a public auction in Cali from the father of leading Colombian novelist Jorge Isaacs. In 1866 Eder became the consul of the United States in Buenaventura, as well as the vice-consul of Chile. In 1867 he traveled to London where he met and married Elizabeth 'Lizzie' Benjamin in the New Synagogue. In their marriage certificate, the name of don Santiago's father is given as 'Moses Eder'. From this marriage were born his children Henry, Charles, Luisa, Walter, Phanor, Fanny and Edith Eder.

== Industrial pioneer in Colombia ==
In 1901, Manuelita became the first Colombian sugar mill to move from mule to steam powered mills. As such, don Santiago became one of Colombia's first industrialists. In 1903 he left his children Charles James and Henry James Eder in charge of his business interests and moved with his wife to New York. He remained there until his death at 83 in 1921. Eder is buried at the Shearith Israel Cemetery in Cypress Hills, Brooklyn. His nephew Montague David Eder was one of England's leading Zionists.

After his death, the Manuelita sugar company saw further expansions in 1927 and 1939. In 1952 under the management of Harold Henry Eder, Santiago's grandson, Manuelita became the first sugarcane mill in Colombia to make refined sugar. Under Santiago Eder's great-grandson Henry James Eder Manuelita started an international expansion, and today is one of Colombia's leading agro/industrial companies with operations in Colombia, Peru, Brazil and Chile. The current president of Manuelita is Harold Eder Garcés, who is don Santiago's great-great-grandson and belongs to the fifth generation of the Eder family in Colombia.

Much of Santiago Eder's correspondence, mostly business-related, but also dealing with the Colombian government and personal family matters, are preserved at the Phanor James Eder Collection at the University of Miami.

== See also ==
- Jews in Colombia
