= Manuelita =

Colombian agribusiness corporation

- Type: Private company
- Industry: Agro-industry
- Founded: 1864
- Founder: Santiago Eder
- Headquarters: Palmira, Colombia
- Area served: Colombia, Peru, Brazil, Chile

Manuelita is a Colombian agribusiness corporation, headquartered in Palmira, Valle del Cauca, Colombia.

== History ==
Manuelita was founded in 1864 when James Martin Eder, better known in Colombia as Santiago Eder, an American citizen born in Mitau, Courland, bought the hacienda "La Manuelita", located near Palmira, from the father of famed Colombian novelist Jorge Isaacs at a public auction. The farm's namesake was Manuela Ferrer Scarpetta, Isaacs' mother.

Eder planted various crops, including coffee in the farm, but eventually centered on sugar, and "on the first day of the first year of the twentieth century" he inaugurated a new sugar mill which had Colombia's first steam engine, and replaced the former ox-powered mill.

After don Santiago's retirement in 1903, Manuelita continued to grow under the leadership of his sons Charles James Eder, and Henry James Eder, his grandson Harold Henry Eder Caicedo, and his great-grandson Henry James Eder Caicedo. As of April 1, 2008, don Santiago's great-great-grandson Harold Enrique Eder Garcés was President of IMSA. In 1980, the size of the company was cut in half, after barely surviving a hostile takeover attempt by the Carlos Ardila Lülle's business group. This resulted in the split of the Ingenio Manuelita and Ingenio del Cauca sugar mills. This latter mill had been founded by Harold Henry Eder while he was at the head of the Eder Family enterprise and was hence a great loss to the family both economically and sentimentally.

Under Henry J. Eder's stewardship (1965–2008), Manuelita's standing in Colombia's sugar sector in terms of production fully recovered and even surpassed when compared to Manuelita and Ingenio del Cauca's combined production levels in 1980. During this period of time, Manuelita also expanded its sugar production to ventures in Peru and Brazil, including a project named Arena Dulce, or Sweet Sand, in which nearly 2000 hectares of Peruvian desert were planted in sugarcane using vanguard drip irrigation technology adapted by Manuelita technicians to the specificities of cane cultivation and harvesting and which are producing record levels of tons of cane per hectare and percentage of sucrose in cane. Additionally, Henry Eder diversified Manuelita into other products and countries in order to diversify risk, namely shrimp (Colombia), mussels (Chile), palm oil (Colombia), ethanol (Colombia, Brazil, Peru), asparagus (Peru), and table grapes (Peru).

Many details of Manuelita's business affairs from the nineteenth and early twentieth centuries are preserved at the Phanor James Eder Collection at the University of Miami, which includes a great deal of don Santiago's business correspondence.
