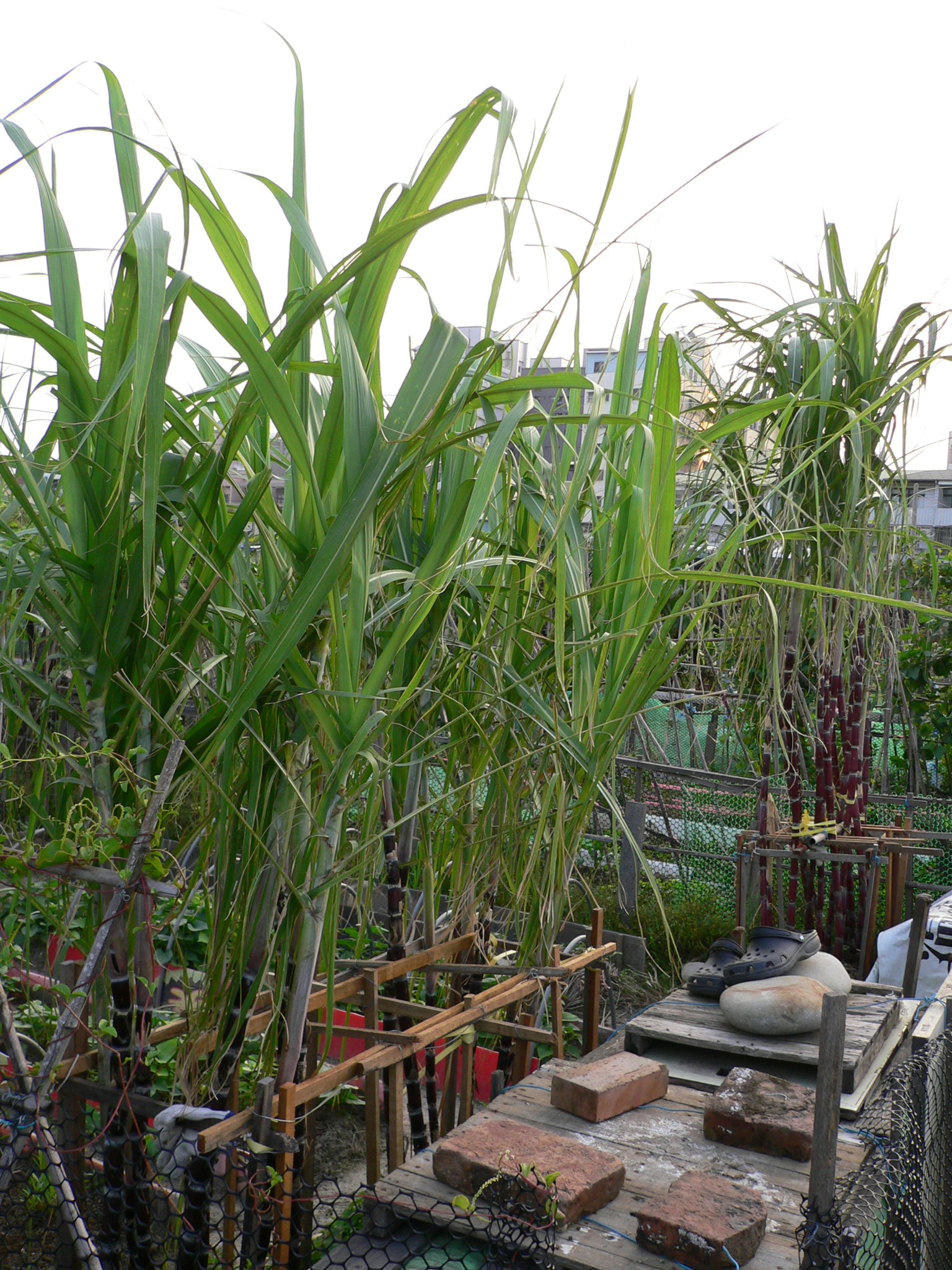

Scientific classification
- Kingdom: Plantae
- Clade: Tracheophytes
- Clade: Angiosperms
- Clade: Monocots
- Clade: Commelinids
- Order: Poales
- Family: Poaceae
- Subfamily: Panicoideae
- Genus: Saccharum
- Species: S. sinense

Binomial name
- Saccharum sinense Roxb.

Synonyms
- Saccharum × barberi Jeswiet

= Saccharum sinense =

Species of grass

Saccharum sinense or Saccharum × sinense, synonym Saccharum × barberi, sugarcane, is strong-growing species of grass (Poaceae) in the genus Saccharum. It originated in India and was originally cultivated in Northern India and China, where it is still commonly grown. It is a more primitive form of sugarcane with a hybrid origin from Saccharum officinarum and Saccharum spontaneum species of cane. A number of clones exists that are often included in the S. officinarum species as the Pansahi group. The most notable member of which is the Uba variety of cane. They are a perennial plant that grows in erect clumps that can reach up to 5 meters in height and have a red cane with a diameter of 15 mm to 30 mm.

== Origin ==
Saccharum Barberi probably originated in India and was originally cultivated in Northern India and China. The second domestication center of sugarcane is India, Indochina, southern China, and Taiwan where S. sinense was a primary cultigen of the Austronesian peoples. Words for sugarcane exist in the Proto-Austronesian languages in Taiwan, reconstructed as *təbuS or **CebuS, which became *tebuh in Proto-Malayo-Polynesian. It was one of the original major crops of the Austronesian peoples from at least 5,500 BP. Introduction of the sweeter S. officinarum may have gradually replaced it throughout its cultivated range in Island Southeast Asia.

From Island Southeast Asia, S. officinarum was spread eastward into Polynesia and Micronesia by Austronesian voyagers as a canoe plant by around 3,500 BP. It was also spread westward and northward by around 3,000 BP to China and India by Austronesian traders, where it further hybridized with Saccharum sinense. From there it spread further into western Eurasia and the Mediterranean.

== Cultivation ==
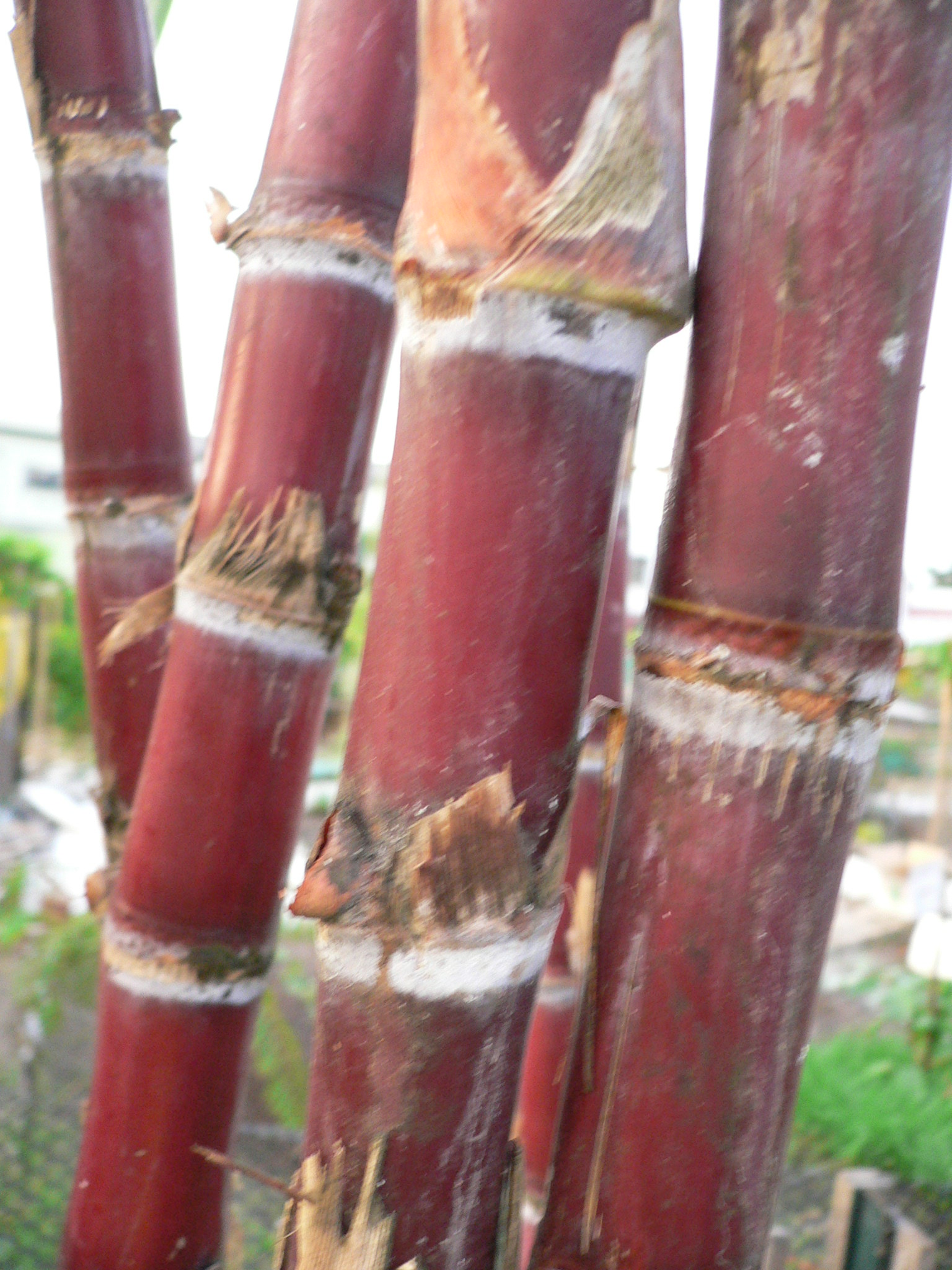
Close up photograph of the red coloured cane of S.sinese.

This variety of sugarcane is noted for being hardier than other varieties as well as being better adapted to poor soils and dry conditions. It tends to be leafier, with relatively hard thin red coloured canes. The plant does best in temperatures that range between 20 °C – 32 °C but is capable of tolerating ranges from 12 °C – 38 °C and very short periods of light frosts. The plant grows best in well-drained soil with a pH range of 5–6.

The plant is still extensively cultivated in the Anhui, Fujian, Guangdong, Guangxi, Guizhou, Hainan, Henan, Hubei, Hunan, Jiangxi, Shaanxi, Sichuan, Yunnan, and Zhejiang regions of China, and Taiwan.

== Specimens and clones ==
Specimens of this cane were sent to Calcutta, India in 1796 from where specimens were sent to Durban, South Africa to help establish the sugar industry there. From Durban specimens were sent to Mauritius in the late 1800s where they adopted the name Uba due to arriving in a water soaked box that had washed off the boxes' original wording "Durban" and leaving only the letters "uba". The cultivation of the heavier yet less valuable Uba variety (due to its lower sucrose content) in Mauritius was instrumental in events that led up to the Uba riots of 1937.

The clone Tekcha of this variety was cultivated in Taiwan. Clones of S. sinense have been used in various breeding programs that have produced many modern varieties of modern sugarcanes.

== See also ==
- Domesticated plants and animals of Austronesia
