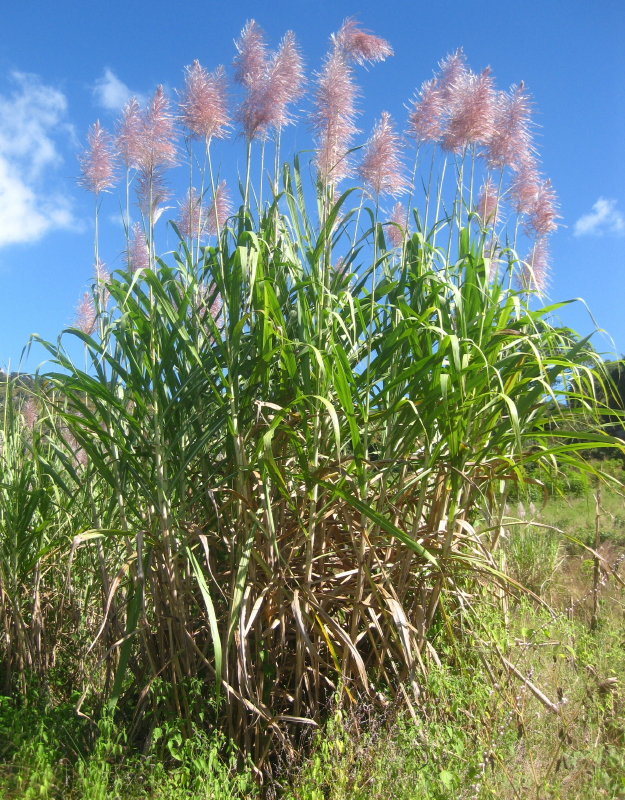
- Saccharum officinarum growing in Mozambique
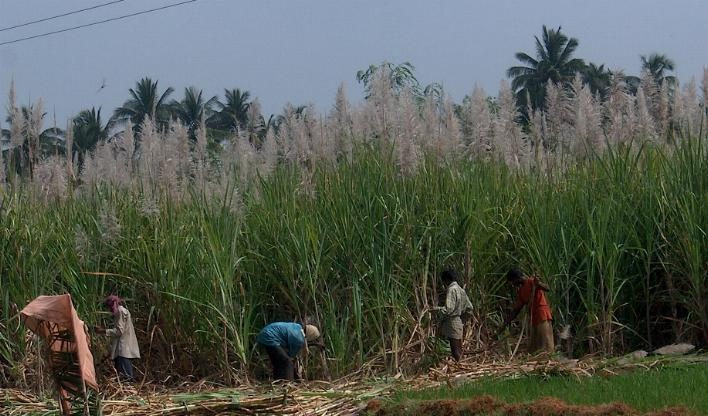
- Harvesting sugarcane by hand

Scientific classification
- Kingdom: Plantae
- Clade: Tracheophytes
- Clade: Angiosperms
- Clade: Monocots
- Clade: Commelinids
- Order: Poales
- Family: Poaceae
- Subfamily: Panicoideae
- Genus: Saccharum
- Species: S. officinarum

Binomial name
- Saccharum officinarum L.

= Saccharum officinarum =

Species of plant

Saccharum officinarum is a large, strong-growing species of grass in the sugarcane genus. Its stout stalks are rich in sucrose, a disaccharide sugar which accumulates in the stalk internodes. It originated in New Guinea, and is now cultivated in tropical and subtropical countries worldwide for the production of sugar, ethanol and other products. It is one of the most productive and most intensively cultivated kinds of sugarcane.

== Description ==
Saccharum officinarum, a perennial plant, grows in clumps consisting of a number of strong unbranched stems. A network of rhizomes forms under the soil which sends up secondary shoots near the parent plant. The stems vary in colour, being green, pinkish, or purple and can reach 5 metres (16 feet) in height. They are jointed, nodes being present at the bases of the alternate leaves. The internodes contain a fibrous white pith immersed in sugary sap. The elongated, linear, green leaves have thick midribs and saw-toothed edges and grow to a length of about 30 to 60 centimetres (12 to 24 inches) and width of 5 cm (2 in).

The terminal inflorescence is a panicle up to 60 cm (24 in) long, a pinkish plume that is broadest at the base and tapering towards the top. The spikelets are borne on side branches and are about 3 millimetres (1/8 in) long and are concealed in tufts of long, silky hair. The fruits are dry and each one contains a single seed. Sugarcane harvest typically occurs before the plants flower, as the flowering process causes a reduction in sugar content.

== Taxonomy ==
Saccharum officinarum was first domesticated in New Guinea and the islands east of the Wallace Line by Papuans, where it is the modern center of diversity. Beginning at around 6,000 BP it was selectively bred from the native S. robustum. From New Guinea it spread westwards to Island Southeast Asia after contact with Austronesians, where it hybridized with S. spontaneum.

It can interbreed with other sugarcane species, such as S. sinense and S. barberi. The major commercial cultivars are complex hybrids.

== Pests ==
S. officinarum is a common host of the oriental beetle (Exomala orientalis). During their larval stage, these beetles feed on the roots of the plant which affects its growth. Current pesticides are still being researched.

== Uses ==
Portions of the stem of this and several other species of sugarcane have been used from ancient times for chewing to extract the sweet juice. It was cultivated in New Guinea about 8,000 years ago for this purpose. Extraction of the juice and boiling to concentrate it was probably first done in India more than 2,000 years ago.

Saccharum officinarum and its hybrids are grown for the production of sugar, ethanol, and other industrial uses in tropical and subtropical regions around the world. The stems and the byproducts of the sugar industry are used for feeding to livestock. Pigs fed on sugarcane juice and a soy-based protein supplement produced stronger piglets that grow faster than those on a more conventional diet. As its specific name (officinarum, "of dispensaries") implies, it is also used in traditional medicine both internally and externally.

About 70% of the sugar produced worldwide comes from S. officinarum and hybrids using this species.

== In culture ==
The Hawaiian word for this species is kō.

== See also ==
- Domesticated plants and animals of Austronesia
