= Rhadinosa reticulata =

Scientific classification
- Kingdom: Animalia
- Phylum: Arthropoda
- Class: Insecta
- Order: Coleoptera
- Suborder: Polyphaga
- Infraorder: Cucujiformia
- Family: Chrysomelidae
- Genus: Rhadinosa
- Species: R. reticulata

Binomial name
- Rhadinosa reticulata (Baly, 1888)

Synonyms
- Hispa reticulata Baly, 1888

Species of beetle

Rhadinosa reticulata is a species of beetle of the family Chrysomelidae. It is found in China (Fujian, Hainan), Myanmar, Nepal and Thailand.

== Life history ==
No host plant has been documented for this species.
