= Acmenychus =

Scientific classification
- Kingdom: Animalia
- Phylum: Arthropoda
- Clade: Pancrustacea
- Class: Insecta
- Order: Coleoptera
- Suborder: Polyphaga
- Infraorder: Cucujiformia
- Family: Chrysomelidae
- Subfamily: Cassidinae
- Tribe: Hispini
- Genus: Acmenychus; Weise, 1905

Synonyms
- Monochirus Heyden, 1878 (preocc.); Decispella Uhmann, 1940

Genus of leaf beetles

Acmenychus is a genus of beetles belonging to the family Chrysomelidae.

== Species ==
- Acmenychus caucasicus (Heyden, 1879)
- Acmenychus discernenda (Uhmann, 1949)
- Acmenychus inermis (Zubkoff, 1833)
- Acmenychus monochiri (Uhmann, 1940)
- Acmenychus planus Maulik, 1919

== Selected former species ==
- Acmenychus tuberculosus (Motschulsky, 1861)
