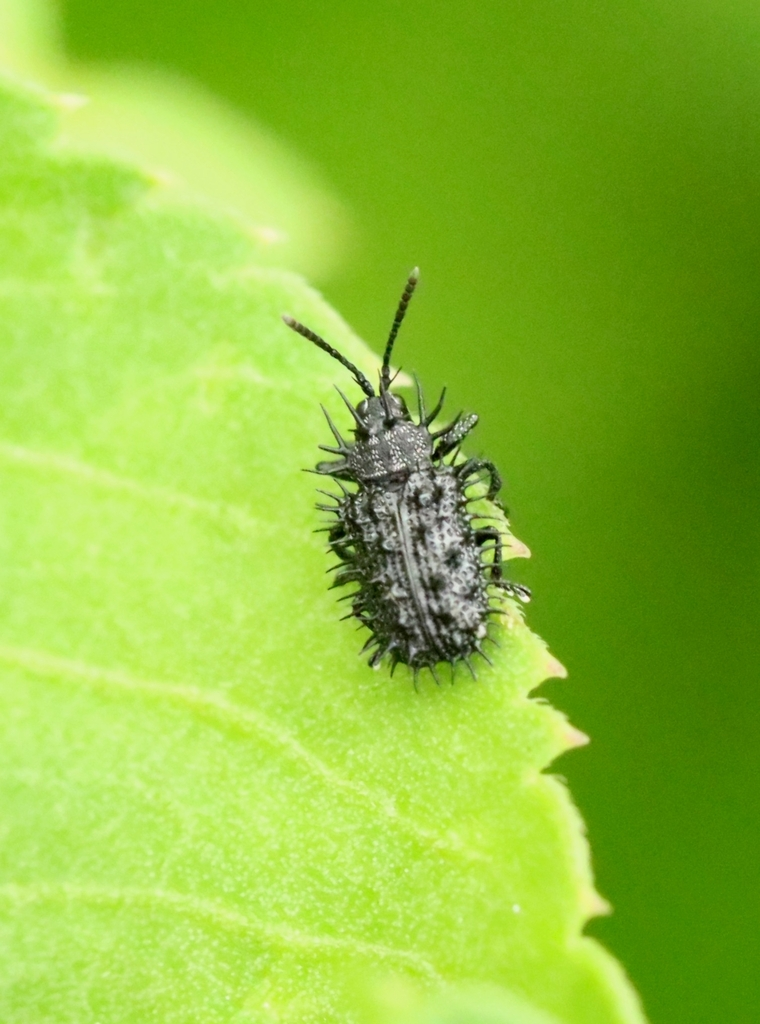

Scientific classification
- Kingdom: Animalia
- Phylum: Arthropoda
- Class: Insecta
- Order: Coleoptera
- Suborder: Polyphaga
- Infraorder: Cucujiformia
- Family: Chrysomelidae
- Genus: Rhadinosa
- Species: R. fleutiauxi

Binomial name
- Rhadinosa fleutiauxi (Baly, 1890)

Synonyms
- Hispa fleutiauxi Baly, 1890

= Rhadinosa fleutiauxi =

Species of beetle

Rhadinosa fleutiauxi is a species of beetle of the family Chrysomelidae. It is found in China (Fujian, Hainan, Hubei, Hunan, Jiangxi, Guangxi, Guangdong), Laos, Malaysia, Myanmar, Thailand and Vietnam.

== Life history ==
The recorded host plants for this species are wild grasses, including Centotheca species.
