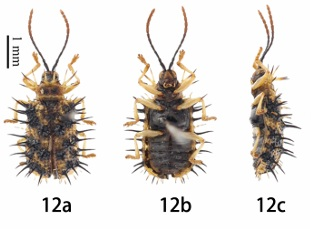

Scientific classification
- Kingdom: Animalia
- Phylum: Arthropoda
- Clade: Pancrustacea
- Class: Insecta
- Order: Coleoptera
- Suborder: Polyphaga
- Infraorder: Cucujiformia
- Family: Chrysomelidae
- Subfamily: Cassidinae
- Tribe: Hispini
- Genus: Dactylispa
- Species: D. feae

Binomial name
- Dactylispa feae (Gestro, 1888)

Synonyms
- Hispa feae Gestro, 1888; Dactylispa filiola Weise, 1897; Dactylispa flavomaculata Uhmann, 1930

= Dactylispa feae =

Species of beetle

Dactylispa feae, is a species of leaf beetle found in India, China (Fujian, Guangdong, Guangxi, Hainan, Hunan, Jiangxi, Sichuan, Yunnan), Taiwan, Sri Lanka, Indonesia, Myanmar, Sumatra, Cambodia Laos, Malaysia, Thailand and Vietnam.

== Life history ==
The recorded host plant for this species is an unidentified species of grass (Poaceae).
