= Acmenychus caucasicus =

Scientific classification
- Kingdom: Animalia
- Phylum: Arthropoda
- Clade: Pancrustacea
- Class: Insecta
- Order: Coleoptera
- Suborder: Polyphaga
- Infraorder: Cucujiformia
- Family: Chrysomelidae
- Genus: Acmenychus
- Species: A. caucasicus

Binomial name
- Acmenychus caucasicus (Heyden, 1879)

Synonyms
- Monochirus caucasicus Heyden, 1879; Hispa inermis Motschulsky, 1861 (not Zubkoff)

Species of beetle

Acmenychus caucasicus is a species of beetle of the family Chrysomelidae. It is found in Armenia, Iran and Turkey.

== Description ==
Adults reach a length of about 5.5-6.5 mm. Externally, the adults are very similar to Acmenychus inermis and it is considered conspecific with A. inermis or as western race of this species by some authors.

== Life history ==
No host plant has been documented for this species.
