= Asamangulia =

Scientific classification
- Kingdom: Animalia
- Phylum: Arthropoda
- Clade: Pancrustacea
- Class: Insecta
- Order: Coleoptera
- Suborder: Polyphaga
- Infraorder: Cucujiformia
- Family: Chrysomelidae
- Subfamily: Cassidinae
- Tribe: Hispini
- Genus: Asamangulia; Maulik, 1915

Genus of leaf beetles

Asamangulia is a genus of beetles belonging to the family Chrysomelidae.

== Species ==
- Asamangulia cuspidata Maulik, 1915
- Asamangulia horni Uhmann, 1927
- Asamangulia longispina Gressitt, 1950
- Asamangulia tuberculosus (Motschulsky, 1861)
- Asamangulia wakkeri (Zehntner, 1896)
- Asamangulia yonakuni Kimoto & Gressitt, 1966
