= Rhadinosa lebongensis =

Scientific classification
- Kingdom: Animalia
- Phylum: Arthropoda
- Class: Insecta
- Order: Coleoptera
- Suborder: Polyphaga
- Infraorder: Cucujiformia
- Family: Chrysomelidae
- Genus: Rhadinosa
- Species: R. lebongensis

Binomial name
- Rhadinosa lebongensis Maulik, 1919

Species of beetle

Rhadinosa lebongensis is a species of beetle of the family Chrysomelidae. It is found in Bhutan, China (Fujian, Jiangxi, Yunnan), India (Manipur, Meghalaya, Ranikhet, Uttar Pradesh, Sikkim, West Bengal) and Nepal.

== Life history ==
The recorded host plants for this species are Oryza sativa and Saccharum officinarum.
