= Pleurispa misella =

Scientific classification
- Kingdom: Animalia
- Phylum: Arthropoda
- Class: Insecta
- Order: Coleoptera
- Suborder: Polyphaga
- Infraorder: Cucujiformia
- Family: Chrysomelidae
- Genus: Pleurispa
- Species: P. misella

Binomial name
- Pleurispa misella Weise, 1902

Synonyms
- Pleurispa salamensis Uhmann, 1928

Species of beetle

Pleurispa misella is a species of beetle of the family Chrysomelidae. It is found in Kenya and Tanzania.

== Life history ==
No host plant has been documented for this species.
