= Chrysispa =

Scientific classification
- Kingdom: Animalia
- Phylum: Arthropoda
- Clade: Pancrustacea
- Class: Insecta
- Order: Coleoptera
- Suborder: Polyphaga
- Infraorder: Cucujiformia
- Family: Chrysomelidae
- Subfamily: Cassidinae
- Tribe: Hispini
- Genus: Chrysispa; Weise, 1897

Genus of leaf beetles

Chrysispa is a genus of African leaf beetles belonging to the tribe Hispini.

== Species ==
- Chrysispa acanthina (Reiche, 1850)
- Chrysispa natalica (Péringuey, 1898)
- Chrysispa paucispina Weise, 1897
- Chrysispa viridiaenea (Guérin-Méneville, 1841)
- Chrysispa viridicyanea (Kraatz, 1895)
