= Pseudispella subspinosa =

Scientific classification
- Kingdom: Animalia
- Phylum: Arthropoda
- Class: Insecta
- Order: Coleoptera
- Suborder: Polyphaga
- Infraorder: Cucujiformia
- Family: Chrysomelidae
- Genus: Pseudispella
- Species: P. subspinosa

Binomial name
- Pseudispella subspinosa (Guérin-Méneville, 1841)

Synonyms
- Hispa subspinosa Guérin-Méneville, 1841

Species of beetle

Pseudispella subspinosa is a species of beetle of the family Chrysomelidae. It is found in Senegal.

== Life history ==
No host plant has been documented for this species.
