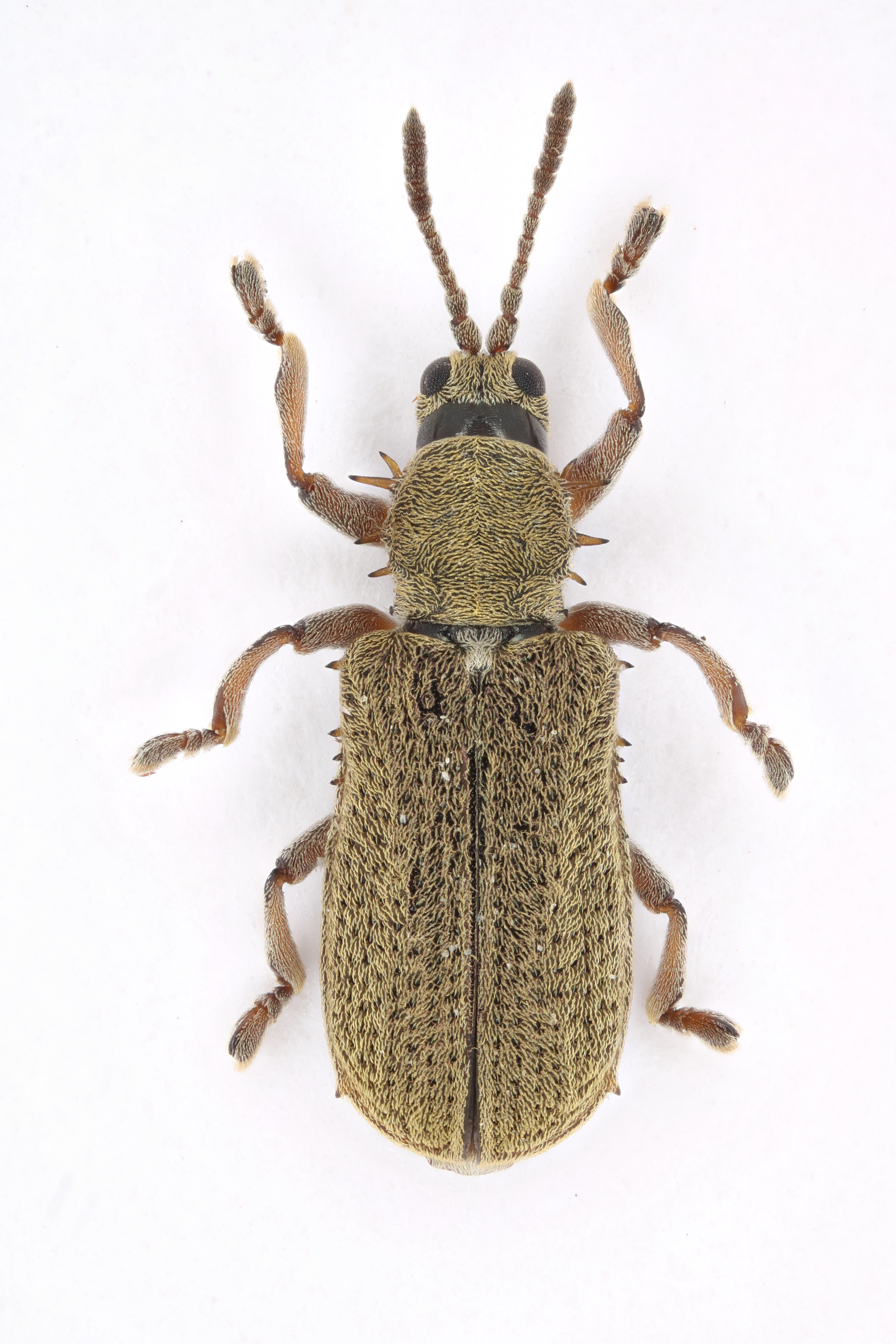

Scientific classification
- Kingdom: Animalia
- Phylum: Arthropoda
- Clade: Pancrustacea
- Class: Insecta
- Order: Coleoptera
- Suborder: Polyphaga
- Infraorder: Cucujiformia
- Family: Chrysomelidae
- Subfamily: Cassidinae
- Tribe: Hispini
- Genus: Trichispa; Chapuis, 1875
- Species: T. sericea

Binomial name
- Trichispa sericea (Guérin-Méneville, 1844)

Synonyms
- Lesageana L. Medvedev, 2003; Hispa sericea Guérin-Méneville, 1844; Lesageana paucispina L. Medvedev, 2003

= Trichispa =

Genus of leaf beetles

Trichispa is a monotypic genus of beetles belonging to the family Chrysomelidae. The only species is Trichispa sericea. The species is found in Southern Africa, where it has been recorded from Angola, Burundi, Cameroon, Congo, Eritrea, Ethiopia, Ivory Coast, Kenya, Madagascar, Mali, Nigeria, Rwanda, Senegal, South Africa, Sudan, Swaziland, Tanzania, Togo, Uganda and Zaire.

== Life history ==
The recorded host plants for this species are Oryza sativa, Chloris virgata, Echinochloa holubii, Eragrostis aethiopica, Eragrostis heteromera, Digitaria zeyheri and Diplachne fusca.
