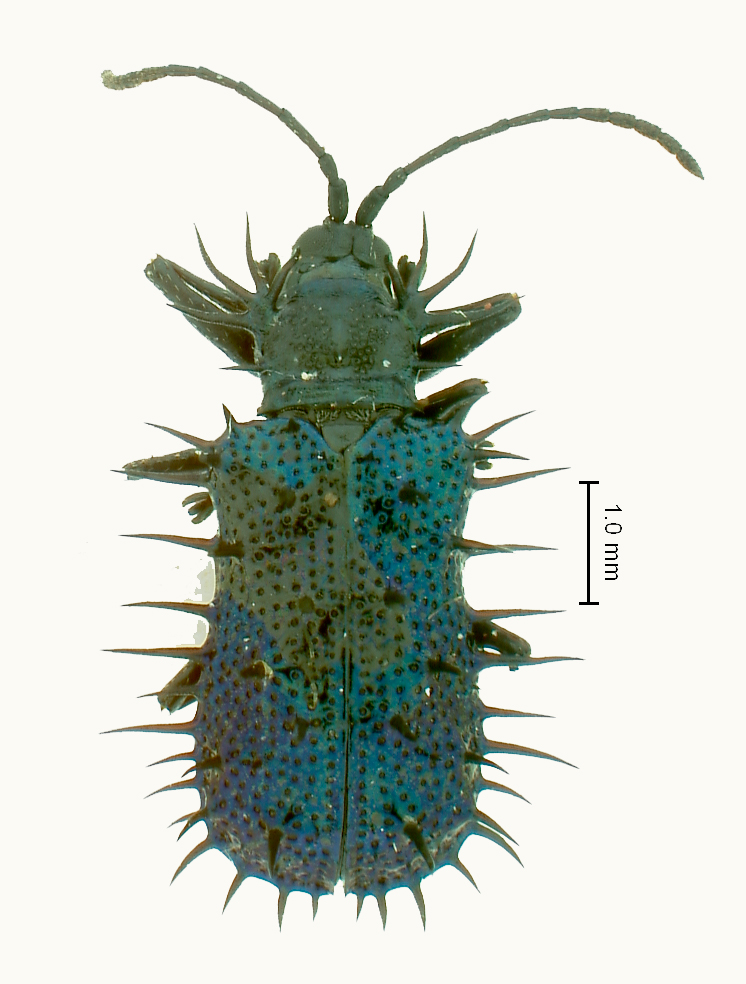

Scientific classification
- Kingdom: Animalia
- Phylum: Arthropoda
- Clade: Pancrustacea
- Class: Insecta
- Order: Coleoptera
- Suborder: Polyphaga
- Infraorder: Cucujiformia
- Family: Chrysomelidae
- Genus: Chrysispa
- Species: C. viridiaenea

Binomial name
- Chrysispa viridiaenea (Guérin-Méneville, 1841)

Synonyms
- Hispa viridiaenea Guérin-Méneville, 1841

= Chrysispa viridiaenea =

Species of beetle

Chrysispa viridiaenea is a species of beetle of the family Chrysomelidae. It is found in Guinea-Bissau and Senegal.

== Life history ==
No host plant has been documented for this species.
