= Sinispa =

Scientific classification
- Kingdom: Animalia
- Phylum: Arthropoda
- Clade: Pancrustacea
- Class: Insecta
- Order: Coleoptera
- Suborder: Polyphaga
- Infraorder: Cucujiformia
- Family: Chrysomelidae
- Subfamily: Cassidinae
- Tribe: Hispini
- Genus: Sinispa; Uhmann, 1938

Genus of leaf beetles

Sinispa is a genus of beetles belonging to the family Chrysomelidae.

== Species ==
- Sinispa tayana (Gressitt, 1939)
- Sinispa yunnana Uhmann, 1940
