= Chrysispa natalica =

Scientific classification
- Kingdom: Animalia
- Phylum: Arthropoda
- Class: Insecta
- Order: Coleoptera
- Suborder: Polyphaga
- Infraorder: Cucujiformia
- Family: Chrysomelidae
- Genus: Chrysispa
- Species: C. natalica

Binomial name
- Chrysispa natalica (Péringuey, 1898)

Synonyms
- Hispa natalica Péringuey, 1898; Chrysispa fera Weise, 1901; Hispa formosa Achard, 1917; (preocc.): Hispa chatanayi Achard, 1921

Species of beetle

Chrysispa natalica is a species of beetle of the family Chrysomelidae. It is found in Angola, Cameroon, Congo, Guinea, Mozambique, Nigeria, South Africa, Tanzania, Togo and Zimbabwe.

== Life history ==
No host plant has been documented for this species.
