= Rhadinosa yunnanica =

Scientific classification
- Kingdom: Animalia
- Phylum: Arthropoda
- Class: Insecta
- Order: Coleoptera
- Suborder: Polyphaga
- Infraorder: Cucujiformia
- Family: Chrysomelidae
- Genus: Rhadinosa
- Species: R. yunnanica

Binomial name
- Rhadinosa yunnanica Chen & Sun, 1962

Species of beetle

Rhadinosa yunnanica is a species of beetle of the family Chrysomelidae. It is found in China (Yunnan).

No host plant has been documented for this species.
