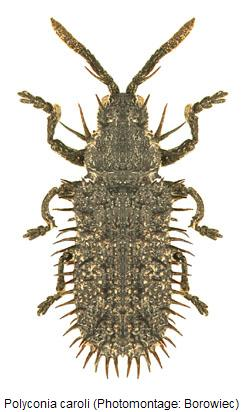

Scientific classification
- Kingdom: Animalia
- Phylum: Arthropoda
- Class: Insecta
- Order: Coleoptera
- Suborder: Polyphaga
- Infraorder: Cucujiformia
- Family: Chrysomelidae
- Genus: Polyconia
- Species: P. caroli

Binomial name
- Polyconia caroli (Leprieur, 1883)

Synonyms
- Hispa caroli Leprieur, 1883

= Polyconia caroli =

Species of beetle

Polyconia caroli is a species of beetle of the family Chrysomelidae. It is found in Algeria, Italy (Sicily) and southern Spain.

== Description ==
Adults are dark brown with black spines.

== Life history ==
No host plant has been documented for this species.
