= Monohispa singularis =

Scientific classification
- Kingdom: Animalia
- Phylum: Arthropoda
- Class: Insecta
- Order: Coleoptera
- Suborder: Polyphaga
- Infraorder: Cucujiformia
- Family: Chrysomelidae
- Genus: Monohispa
- Species: M. singularis

Binomial name
- Monohispa singularis (Gestro, 1888)

Synonyms
- Hispa singularis Gestro, 1888; Dactylispa singularis

Species of beetle

Monohispa singularis is a species of beetle of the family Chrysomelidae. It is found in Laos, Myanmar and Vietnam.

== Life history ==
No host plant has been documented for this species.
