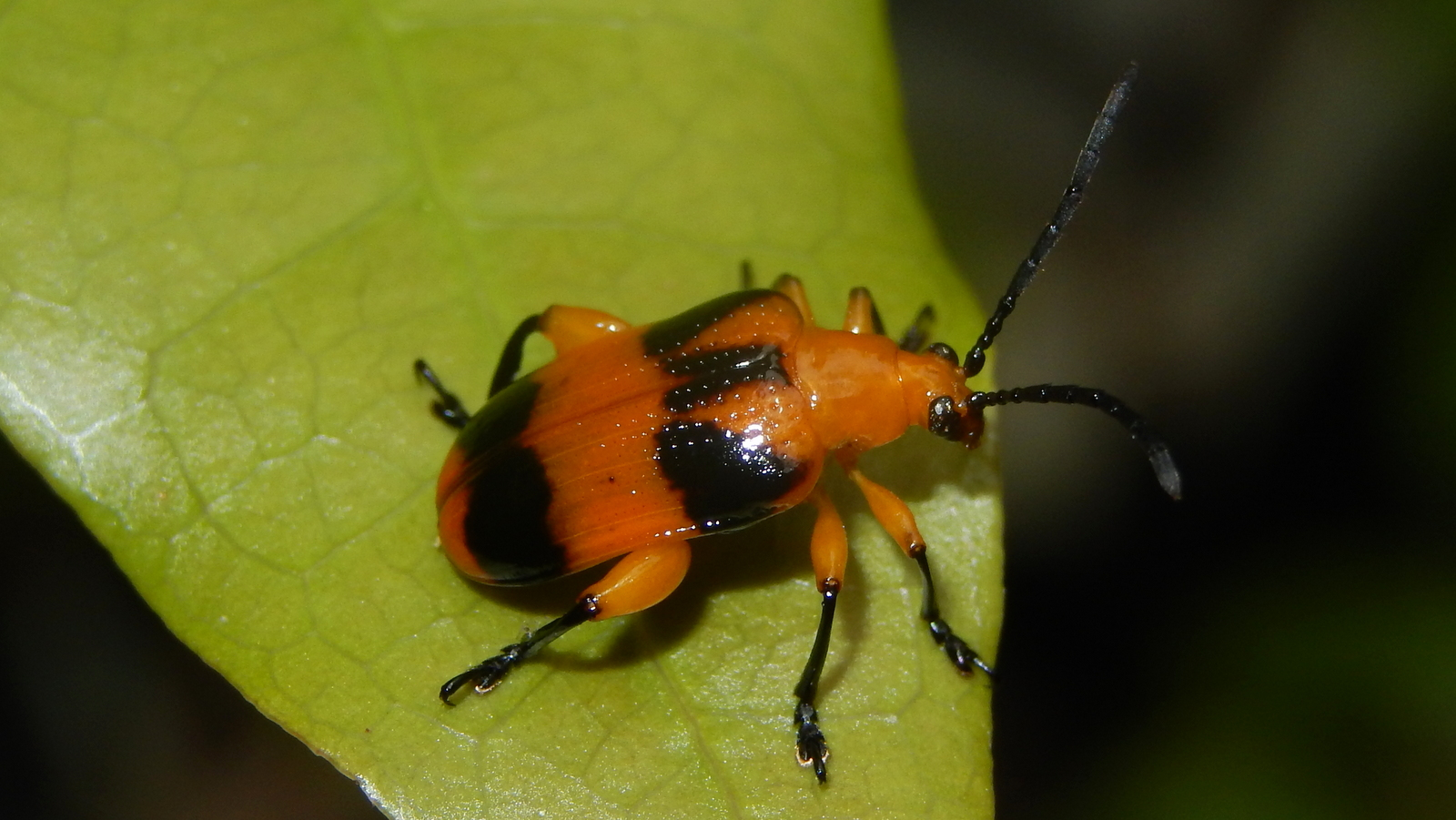

Scientific classification
- Domain: Eukaryota
- Kingdom: Animalia
- Phylum: Arthropoda
- Class: Insecta
- Order: Coleoptera
- Suborder: Polyphaga
- Infraorder: Cucujiformia
- Family: Chrysomelidae
- Genus: Stethopachys
- Species: S. formosa

Binomial name
- Stethopachys formosa Baly 1861

= Stethopachys formosa =

Species of beetle

Stethopachys formosa, the orchid beetle or dendrobium beetle, is an Australian insect found in northern New South Wales, Northern Territory and Queensland. They cannot survive in colder climates, and they do not appear in Southern states. This insect feeds on the flowers and leaves of orchids, often causing damage to cultivated plants.

== Appearance ==
Dendrobium beetles are bright orange with large black spots on their wing covers. They have long black antenna, and wings hidden behind the patterned wing covers. The adult dendrobium beetle grows to approximately 12mm (0.5 inches).

== Damage to Dendrobium orchids ==
The adult dendrobium beetle feeds on the Dendrobium plant, especially the leaves, buds, flowers, and seed pods. The adult beetle will also lay eggs on the leaves, buds, flowers, and seed pods of the plant. Once the beetle larvae has hatched, it will proceed to eat through the leaves and stems of the orchid plant.
