= Pseudispella petitii =

Scientific classification
- Kingdom: Animalia
- Phylum: Arthropoda
- Class: Insecta
- Order: Coleoptera
- Suborder: Polyphaga
- Infraorder: Cucujiformia
- Family: Chrysomelidae
- Genus: Pseudispella
- Species: P. petitii

Binomial name
- Pseudispella petitii (Guérin-Méneville, 1841)

Synonyms
- Hispa petitii Guérin-Méneville, 1841; Hispa (Hispella) incerta Chapuis, 1877

Species of beetle

Pseudispella petitii is a species of beetle of the family Chrysomelidae. It is found in Guinea-Bissau, Rwanda, Senegal and Togo.

== Life history ==
No host plant has been documented for this species.
