= Pseudispella areolata =

Scientific classification
- Kingdom: Animalia
- Phylum: Arthropoda
- Class: Insecta
- Order: Coleoptera
- Suborder: Polyphaga
- Infraorder: Cucujiformia
- Family: Chrysomelidae
- Genus: Pseudispella
- Species: P. areolata

Binomial name
- Pseudispella areolata Uhmann, 1928

Species of beetle

Pseudispella areolata is a species of beetle of the family Chrysomelidae. It is found in Congo, Kenya and Tanzania.

== Life history ==
No host plant has been documented for this species.
