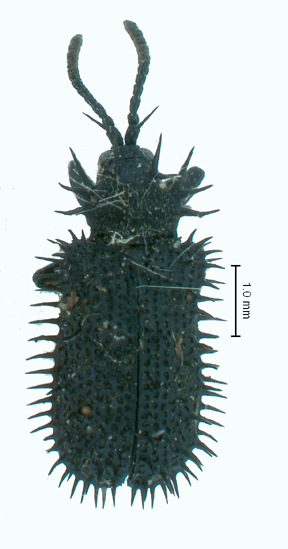

Scientific classification
- Kingdom: Animalia
- Phylum: Arthropoda
- Class: Insecta
- Order: Coleoptera
- Suborder: Polyphaga
- Infraorder: Cucujiformia
- Family: Chrysomelidae
- Genus: Rhadinosa
- Species: R. nigrocyanea

Binomial name
- Rhadinosa nigrocyanea (Motschulsky, 1861)

Synonyms
- Hispa nigrocyanea Motschulsky, 1861; Rhadinosa reticulata Uhmann, 1940

= Rhadinosa nigrocyanea =

Species of beetle

Rhadinosa nigrocyanea is a species of beetle of the family Chrysomelidae. It is found in China (Anhui, Zhejiang, Fujian, Hainan, Jiangxi, Jiangsu, Guangdong, Manchuria, Xinjiang, Yunnan), Japan, Korea and Russia (Siberia).

== Life history ==
The recorded host plants for this species are Digitaria glabra, Oryza sativa, Miscanthus and Arundinella species.
