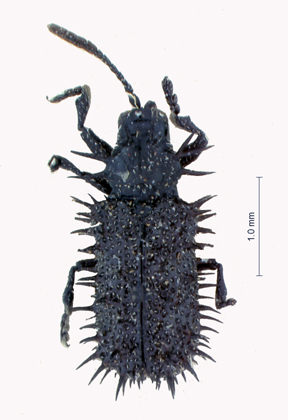

Scientific classification
- Kingdom: Animalia
- Phylum: Arthropoda
- Clade: Pancrustacea
- Class: Insecta
- Order: Coleoptera
- Suborder: Polyphaga
- Infraorder: Cucujiformia
- Family: Chrysomelidae
- Subfamily: Cassidinae
- Tribe: Hispini
- Genus: Unguispa; Uhmann, 1954
- Species: U. impar

Binomial name
- Unguispa impar Uhmann, 1954

= Unguispa =

Genus of beetles

Unguispa is a genus of leaf beetles in the family Chrysomelidae. It is monotypic, being represented by the single species, Unguispa impar, which is found in Madagascar.

== Life history ==
No host plant has been documented for this species.
