= Rhadinosa girija =

Scientific classification
- Kingdom: Animalia
- Phylum: Arthropoda
- Class: Insecta
- Order: Coleoptera
- Suborder: Polyphaga
- Infraorder: Cucujiformia
- Family: Chrysomelidae
- Genus: Rhadinosa
- Species: R. girija

Binomial name
- Rhadinosa girija Maulik, 1915

Species of beetle

Rhadinosa girija is a species of beetle of the family Chrysomelidae. It is found in Nepal.

== Life history ==
No host plant has been documented for this species.
