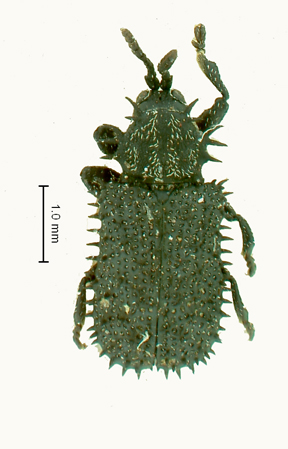

Scientific classification
- Kingdom: Animalia
- Phylum: Arthropoda
- Clade: Pancrustacea
- Class: Insecta
- Order: Coleoptera
- Suborder: Polyphaga
- Infraorder: Cucujiformia
- Family: Chrysomelidae
- Subfamily: Cassidinae
- Tribe: Hispini
- Genus: Rhodtrispa; Chen & T’an, 1964
- Species: R. dilaticornis

Binomial name
- Rhodtrispa dilaticornis (Duvivier, 1891)

Synonyms
- Hispa dilaticornis Duvivier, 1891; Dactylispa dilaticornis; Dactylispa arisana Chûjô, 1933; Dactylispa assamensis Weise, 1904; Dactylispa clavata Gestro, 1904 (not Weise 1901); Dactylispa clavicornis Chen & T’an, 1964; Dactylispa luhi Uhmann, 1951; Dactylispa perpusilla Gestro, 1911; Dactylispa pusilla Weise, 1905

= Rhodtrispa =

Genus of beetles

Rhodtrispa is a genus of leaf beetles in the family Chrysomelidae. It is monotypic, being represented by the single species, Rhodtrispa dilaticornis, which is found in India (Assam, Bihar, Kerala, Madhya Pradesh, Maharashtra, Orissa, Punjab, Pondicherry, Tamil Nadu, Uttar Pradesh, West Bengal), Sri Lanka, Afghanistan, Bangladesh, Bhutan, China (Shandong, Yunnan), Eritrea, Ethiopia, Laos, Nepal, Taiwan, Thailand, the United Arab Emirates and Vietnam.

== Life history ==
The recorded host plants for this species are Panicum species, Arthraxon hispidus and Oryza sativa.
