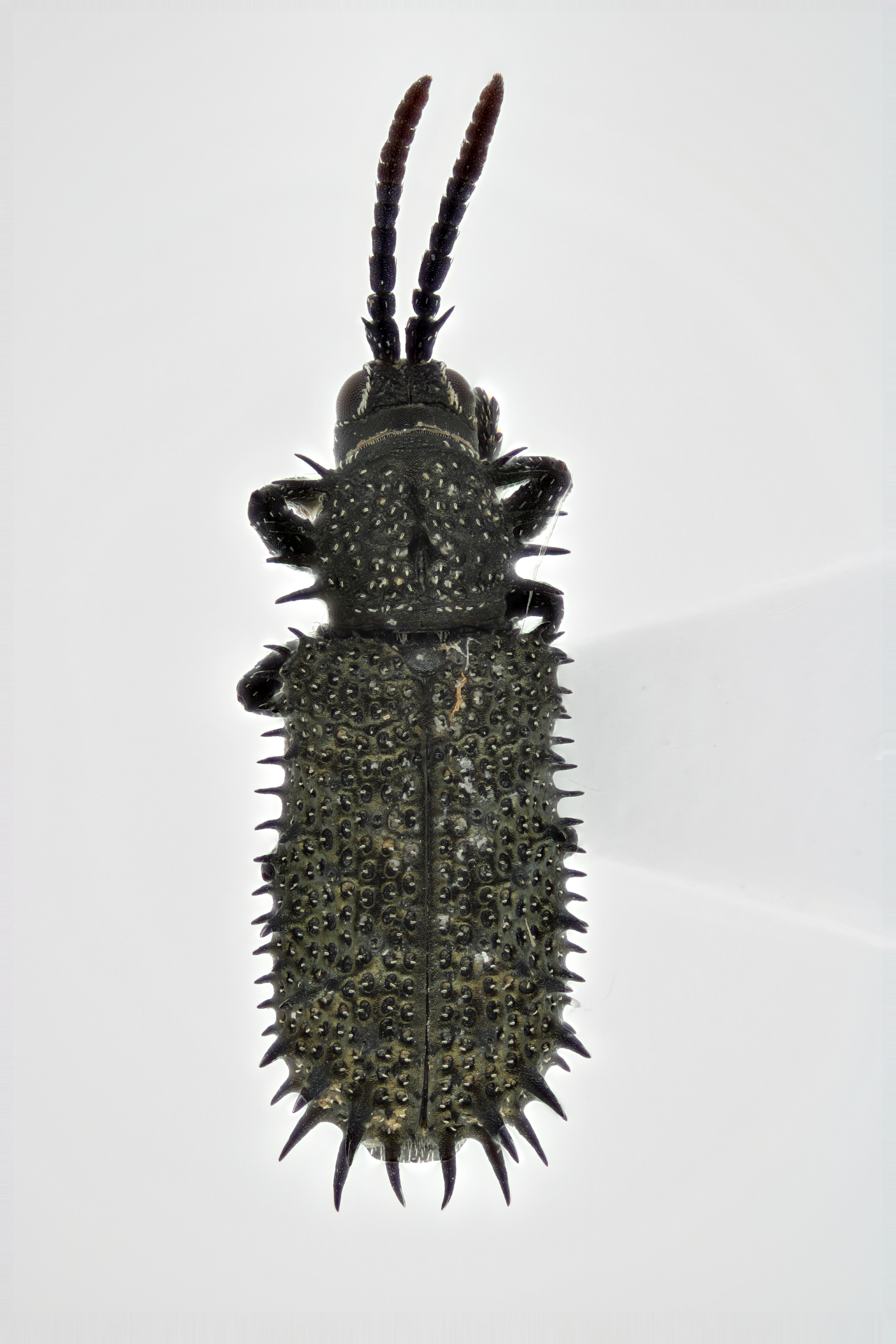

Scientific classification
- Kingdom: Animalia
- Phylum: Arthropoda
- Clade: Pancrustacea
- Class: Insecta
- Order: Coleoptera
- Suborder: Polyphaga
- Infraorder: Cucujiformia
- Family: Chrysomelidae
- Subfamily: Cassidinae
- Tribe: Hispini
- Genus: Philodonta; Weise, 1904

Synonyms
- Pleruispella Uhmann, 1931

= Philodonta =

Genus of leaf beetles

Philodonta is a genus of beetles belonging to the family Chrysomelidae.

== Species ==
- Philodonta chirinda Maulik, 1919
- Philodonta modesta Weise, 1904
- Philodonta tuberculata (Pic, 1924)
