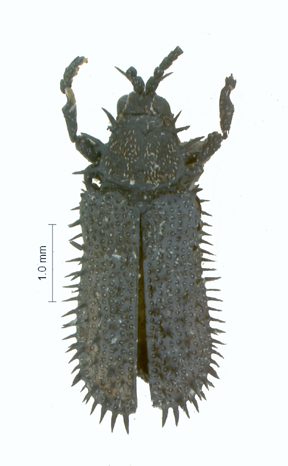

Scientific classification
- Kingdom: Animalia
- Phylum: Arthropoda
- Clade: Pancrustacea
- Class: Insecta
- Order: Coleoptera
- Suborder: Polyphaga
- Infraorder: Cucujiformia
- Family: Chrysomelidae
- Subfamily: Cassidinae
- Tribe: Hispini
- Genus: Phidodontina; Uhmann, 1938
- Species: P. gedyei

Binomial name
- Phidodontina gedyei Uhmann, 1938

= Phidodontina =

Genus of beetles

Phidodontina is a genus of leaf beetles in the family Chrysomelidae. It is monotypic, being represented by the single species, Phidodontina gedyei, which is found in Kenya.

No host plant has been documented for this species.
