= Asamangulia yonakuni =

Scientific classification
- Kingdom: Animalia
- Phylum: Arthropoda
- Clade: Pancrustacea
- Class: Insecta
- Order: Coleoptera
- Suborder: Polyphaga
- Infraorder: Cucujiformia
- Family: Chrysomelidae
- Genus: Asamangulia
- Species: A. yonakuni

Binomial name
- Asamangulia yonakuni Kimoto & Gressitt, 1966

Species of beetle

Asamangulia yonakuni is a species of beetle of the family Chrysomelidae. It is found in Japan (Ryukyu Islands).

== Life history ==
No host plant has been documented for this species.
