= Acmenychus monochiri =

Scientific classification
- Kingdom: Animalia
- Phylum: Arthropoda
- Clade: Pancrustacea
- Class: Insecta
- Order: Coleoptera
- Suborder: Polyphaga
- Infraorder: Cucujiformia
- Family: Chrysomelidae
- Genus: Acmenychus
- Species: A. monochiri

Binomial name
- Acmenychus monochiri (Uhmann, 1940)

Synonyms
- Decispella monochiri Uhmann, 1940

Species of beetle

Acmenychus monochiri is a species of beetle of the family Chrysomelidae. It is found in Angola and Rwanda.

== Life history ==
No host plant has been documented for this species.
