= Cassidispa mirabilis =

Scientific classification
- Kingdom: Animalia
- Phylum: Arthropoda
- Clade: Pancrustacea
- Class: Insecta
- Order: Coleoptera
- Suborder: Polyphaga
- Infraorder: Cucujiformia
- Family: Chrysomelidae
- Genus: Cassidispa
- Species: C. mirabilis

Binomial name
- Cassidispa mirabilis Gestro, 1899

Species of beetle

Cassidispa mirabilis is a species of beetle of the family Chrysomelidae. It is found in China (Hebei, Shanxi, Xikang).

== Life history ==
No host plant has been documented for this species.
