= Sinispa tayana =

Scientific classification
- Kingdom: Animalia
- Phylum: Arthropoda
- Clade: Pancrustacea
- Class: Insecta
- Order: Coleoptera
- Suborder: Polyphaga
- Infraorder: Cucujiformia
- Family: Chrysomelidae
- Genus: Sinispa
- Species: S. tayana

Binomial name
- Sinispa tayana (Gressitt, 1939)

Synonyms
- Rhadinosa tayana Gressitt, 1939

Species of beetle

Sinispa tayana is a species of beetle of the family Chrysomelidae. It is found in China (Hainan Island, Taya Island).

== Life history ==
No host plant has been documented for this species.
