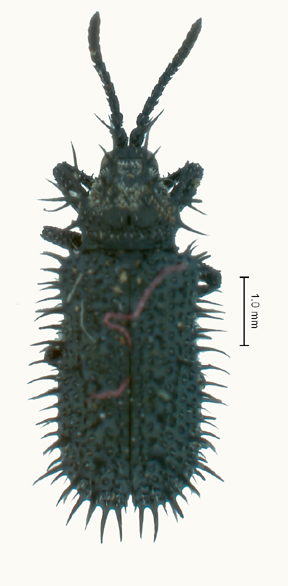

Scientific classification
- Kingdom: Animalia
- Phylum: Arthropoda
- Clade: Pancrustacea
- Class: Insecta
- Order: Coleoptera
- Suborder: Polyphaga
- Infraorder: Cucujiformia
- Family: Chrysomelidae
- Genus: Dorcathispa
- Species: D. bellicosa

Binomial name
- Dorcathispa bellicosa (Guérin-Méneville, 1841)

Synonyms
- Hispa bellicosa Guérin-Méneville, 1841

= Dorcathispa bellicosa =

Species of beetle

Dorcathispa bellicosa is a species of beetle of the family Chrysomelidae. It is found in Cameroon, Congo, Eritrea, Guinea-Bissau, Ivory Coast, Nigeria, Mozambique, Guinea, Senegal, Sierra Leone, Somali, South Africa, Togo and Uganda.

== Life history ==
The recorded host plants for this species are various grasses, including Zea mays and Sorghum vulgare.
