= Pseudispella =

Scientific classification
- Kingdom: Animalia
- Phylum: Arthropoda
- Clade: Pancrustacea
- Class: Insecta
- Order: Coleoptera
- Suborder: Polyphaga
- Infraorder: Cucujiformia
- Family: Chrysomelidae
- Subfamily: Cassidinae
- Tribe: Hispini
- Genus: Pseudispella; Kraatz, 1895

Synonyms
- Hispa (Pseudispella) Kraatz, 1895; Decispella Uhmann, 1940

Genus of leaf beetles

Pseudispella is a genus of beetles belonging to the family Chrysomelidae.

== Species ==
- Pseudispella areolata Uhmann, 1928
- Pseudispella crassicornis (Weise, 1901)
- Pseudispella discernenda (Uhmann, 1949)
- Pseudispella fistulosa Uhmann, 1954
- Pseudispella militaris (Weise, 1901)
- Pseudispella monochiri (Uhmann, 1936)
- Pseudispella petitii (Guérin-Méneville, 1841)
- Pseudispella radiata Uhmann, 1955
- Pseudispella rechenbergi Uhmann, 1928
- Pseudispella spuria (Péringuey, 1898)
- Pseudispella strigella Uhmann, 1961
- Pseudispella subspinosa (Guérin-Méneville, 1841)
- Pseudispella sulcicollis (Gyllenhal, 1817)
