= Pleurispa =

Scientific classification
- Kingdom: Animalia
- Phylum: Arthropoda
- Class: Insecta
- Order: Coleoptera
- Suborder: Polyphaga
- Infraorder: Cucujiformia
- Family: Chrysomelidae
- Subfamily: Cassidinae
- Tribe: Hispini
- Genus: Pleurispa; Weise, 1902

Genus of leaf beetles

Pleurispa is a genus of beetles belonging to the family Chrysomelidae.

== Species ==
- Pleurispa humilis Gestro, 1909
- Pleurispa misella Weise, 1901
- Pleurispa subinermis (Fairmaire, 1902)
- Pleurispa weisei Gestro, 1906
