= Chrysispa acanthina =

Scientific classification
- Kingdom: Animalia
- Phylum: Arthropoda
- Class: Insecta
- Order: Coleoptera
- Suborder: Polyphaga
- Infraorder: Cucujiformia
- Family: Chrysomelidae
- Genus: Chrysispa
- Species: C. acanthina

Binomial name
- Chrysispa acanthina (Reiche, 1850)

Synonyms
- Hispa acanthina Reiche, 1850; Hispa (Chrysispa) squarrosa Weise, 1901

Species of beetle

Chrysispa acanthina is a species of beetle of the family Chrysomelidae. It is found in Angola, Burundi, Cameroon, Congo, Eritrea, Ethiopia, Kenya, Saudi Arabia, Tanzania and Togo.

== Life history ==
No host plant has been documented for this species.
