= Philodonta tuberculata =

Scientific classification
- Kingdom: Animalia
- Phylum: Arthropoda
- Class: Insecta
- Order: Coleoptera
- Suborder: Polyphaga
- Infraorder: Cucujiformia
- Family: Chrysomelidae
- Genus: Philodonta
- Species: P. tuberculata

Binomial name
- Philodonta tuberculata (Pic, 1924)

Synonyms
- Pleurispa tuberculata Pic, 1924; Philodonta sudanica Weise, 1925; Pleruispella weisei Uhmann, 1931

Species of beetle

Philodonta tuberculata is a species of beetle of the family Chrysomelidae. It is found in Congo, Ivory Coast and Rwanda.

== Life history ==
No host plant has been documented for this species.
