= Asamangulia longispina =

Scientific classification
- Kingdom: Animalia
- Phylum: Arthropoda
- Clade: Pancrustacea
- Class: Insecta
- Order: Coleoptera
- Suborder: Polyphaga
- Infraorder: Cucujiformia
- Family: Chrysomelidae
- Genus: Asamangulia
- Species: A. longispina

Binomial name
- Asamangulia longispina Gressitt, 1950

Species of beetle

Asamangulia longispina is a species of beetle of the family Chrysomelidae. It is found in China (Fujian, Guangdong, Hainan, Jiangxi, Jiangxi, Yunnan, Zhejiang).

== Life history ==
The host plant for this species is possibly a Miscanthus species.
