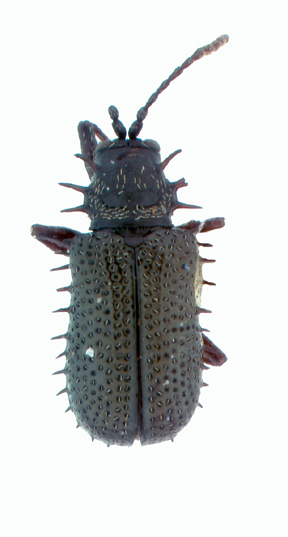

Scientific classification
- Kingdom: Animalia
- Phylum: Arthropoda
- Clade: Pancrustacea
- Class: Insecta
- Order: Coleoptera
- Suborder: Polyphaga
- Infraorder: Cucujiformia
- Family: Chrysomelidae
- Subfamily: Cassidinae
- Tribe: Hispini
- Genus: Thomispa; Würmli, 1975
- Species: T. feae

Binomial name
- Thomispa feae (Gestro, 1906)

Synonyms
- Trichispa feae Gestro, 1905

= Thomispa =

Genus of beetles

Thomispa is a genus of leaf beetles in the family Chrysomelidae. It is monotypic, being represented by the single species, Thomispa feae, which is found on São Tomé.

== Life history ==
The recorded host plants for this species are grasses (Poaceae).
