= Pseudispella spuria =

Scientific classification
- Kingdom: Animalia
- Phylum: Arthropoda
- Class: Insecta
- Order: Coleoptera
- Suborder: Polyphaga
- Infraorder: Cucujiformia
- Family: Chrysomelidae
- Genus: Pseudispella
- Species: P. spuria

Binomial name
- Pseudispella spuria (Péringuey, 1898)

Synonyms
- Hispella spuria Péringuey, 1898

Species of beetle

Pseudispella spuria is a species of beetle of the family Chrysomelidae. It is found in Mozambique and South Africa.

== Life history ==
No host plant has been documented for this species.
