= Rhadinosa horvathi =

Scientific classification
- Kingdom: Animalia
- Phylum: Arthropoda
- Clade: Pancrustacea
- Class: Insecta
- Order: Coleoptera
- Suborder: Polyphaga
- Infraorder: Cucujiformia
- Family: Chrysomelidae
- Genus: Rhadinosa
- Species: R. horvathi

Binomial name
- Rhadinosa horvathi (Gestro, 1907)

Synonyms
- Monochirus horvathi Gestro, 1907

Species of beetle

Rhadinosa horvathi is a species of beetle of the family Chrysomelidae. It is found in Indonesia (Java).

== Life history ==
No host plant has been documented for this species.
