= Asamangulia cuspidata =

Scientific classification
- Kingdom: Animalia
- Phylum: Arthropoda
- Clade: Pancrustacea
- Class: Insecta
- Order: Coleoptera
- Suborder: Polyphaga
- Infraorder: Cucujiformia
- Family: Chrysomelidae
- Genus: Asamangulia
- Species: A. cuspidata

Binomial name
- Asamangulia cuspidata Maulik, 1915

Synonyms
- Asamangulia dreesi Uhmann, 1954

Species of beetle

Asamangulia cuspidata is a species of beetle of the family Chrysomelidae. It is found in Afghanistan, India (Bihar, West Bengal), Thailand, Indonesia, Japan, Taiwan, Nepal and possibly Saudi Arabia.

== Description ==
Adults have shiny black body, covered with spines.

== Life history ==
The recorded host plants for this species are Saccharum officinarum, Oryza sativa and Sorghum species. The larvae mine the leaves of their host plant, feeding between the upper and lower epidermis.
