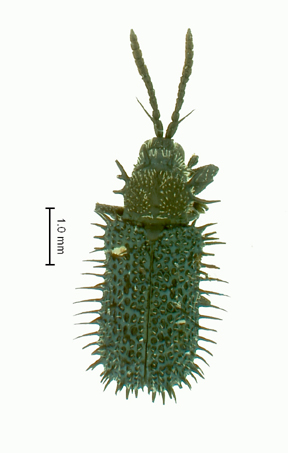

Scientific classification
- Kingdom: Animalia
- Phylum: Arthropoda
- Clade: Pancrustacea
- Class: Insecta
- Order: Coleoptera
- Suborder: Polyphaga
- Infraorder: Cucujiformia
- Family: Chrysomelidae
- Genus: Sinispa
- Species: S. yunnana

Binomial name
- Sinispa yunnana Uhmann, 1938

= Sinispa yunnana =

Species of beetle

Sinispa yunnana is a species of beetle of the family Chrysomelidae. It is found in Cambodia, China (Yunnan), Laos, Thailand and Vietnam.

== Life history ==
No host plant has been documented for this species.
