= Dorcathispa alternata =

Scientific classification
- Kingdom: Animalia
- Phylum: Arthropoda
- Clade: Pancrustacea
- Class: Insecta
- Order: Coleoptera
- Suborder: Polyphaga
- Infraorder: Cucujiformia
- Family: Chrysomelidae
- Genus: Dorcathispa
- Species: D. alternata

Binomial name
- Dorcathispa alternata (Weise, 1900)

Synonyms
- Hispella (Cerathispa) alternata Weise, 1900

Species of beetle

Dorcathispa alternata is a species of beetle of the family Chrysomelidae. It is found in Angola, Congo, Ethiopia, Ivory Coast, Kenya, Mozambique, Niger, Rwanda, South Africa, Sudan, Tanzania, Uganda and Zimbabwe.

== Life history ==
No host plant has been documented for this species.
