= Polyconia =

Scientific classification
- Kingdom: Animalia
- Phylum: Arthropoda
- Clade: Pancrustacea
- Class: Insecta
- Order: Coleoptera
- Suborder: Polyphaga
- Infraorder: Cucujiformia
- Family: Chrysomelidae
- Subfamily: Cassidinae
- Tribe: Hispini
- Genus: Polyconia; Weise, 1905

Genus of leaf beetles

Polyconia is a genus of beetles belonging to the family Chrysomelidae.

== Species ==
- Polyconia caroli (Leprieur, 1883)
- Polyconia fragilis Uhmann, 1954
- Polyconia spinicornis (Kraatz, 1895)
