= Acmenychus planus =

Scientific classification
- Kingdom: Animalia
- Phylum: Arthropoda
- Clade: Pancrustacea
- Class: Insecta
- Order: Coleoptera
- Suborder: Polyphaga
- Infraorder: Cucujiformia
- Family: Chrysomelidae
- Genus: Acmenychus
- Species: A. planus

Binomial name
- Acmenychus planus Maulik, 1919

Species of beetle

Acmenychus planus is a species of beetle of the family Chrysomelidae. It is found in Israel, Jordan, Turkey and Saudi Arabia.

== Life history ==
No host plant has been documented for this species.
