= Rhadinosa =

Scientific classification
- Kingdom: Animalia
- Phylum: Arthropoda
- Clade: Pancrustacea
- Class: Insecta
- Order: Coleoptera
- Suborder: Polyphaga
- Infraorder: Cucujiformia
- Family: Chrysomelidae
- Subfamily: Cassidinae
- Tribe: Hispini
- Genus: Rhadinosa; Weise, 1905

Genus of leaf beetles

Rhadinosa is a genus of beetles belonging to the family Chrysomelidae.

== Species ==
- Rhadinosa abnormis Gressitt & Kimoto, 1963
- Rhadinosa fleutiauxi (Baly, 1889)
- Rhadinosa girija Maulik, 1915
- Rhadinosa horvathi (Gestro, 1907)
- Rhadinosa impressa Pic, 1926
- Rhadinosa laghua Maulik, 1915
- Rhadinosa lebongensis Maulik, 1919
- Rhadinosa machetes (Gestro, 1898)
- Rhadinosa nigrocyanea (Motschulsky, 1861)
- Rhadinosa parvula (Motschulsky, 1861)
- Rhadinosa reticulata (Baly, 1888)
- Rhadinosa yunnanica Chen & Sun, 1962
