= Rhadinosa parvula =

Scientific classification
- Kingdom: Animalia
- Phylum: Arthropoda
- Clade: Pancrustacea
- Class: Insecta
- Order: Coleoptera
- Suborder: Polyphaga
- Infraorder: Cucujiformia
- Family: Chrysomelidae
- Genus: Rhadinosa
- Species: R. parvula

Binomial name
- Rhadinosa parvula (Motschulsky, 1861)

Synonyms
- Hispa parvula Motschulsky, 1861; Hispa nigritula Boheman, 1858

Species of beetle

Rhadinosa parvula is a species of beetle of the family Chrysomelidae. It is found in Bhutan, China, Indonesia (Java, Sumatra) and Thailand.

== Life history ==
The recorded host plants for this species are Oryza sativa, Saccharum officinarum and Zea mays.
