= Chrysispa paucispina =

Scientific classification
- Kingdom: Animalia
- Phylum: Arthropoda
- Class: Insecta
- Order: Coleoptera
- Suborder: Polyphaga
- Infraorder: Cucujiformia
- Family: Chrysomelidae
- Genus: Chrysispa
- Species: C. paucispina

Binomial name
- Chrysispa paucispina Weise, 1897

Species of beetle

Chrysispa paucispina is a species of beetle of the family Chrysomelidae. It is found in Angola, Cameroon, Congo, Ethiopia, Guinea, Nigeria, Rwanda and Togo.

== Life history ==
No host plant has been documented for this species.
