= Acmenychus discernenda =

Scientific classification
- Kingdom: Animalia
- Phylum: Arthropoda
- Clade: Pancrustacea
- Class: Insecta
- Order: Coleoptera
- Suborder: Polyphaga
- Infraorder: Cucujiformia
- Family: Chrysomelidae
- Genus: Acmenychus
- Species: A. discernenda

Binomial name
- Acmenychus discernenda (Uhmann, 1949)

Synonyms
- Decispella discernenda Uhmann, 1949

Species of beetle

Acmenychus discernenda is a species of beetle of the family Chrysomelidae. It is found in Guinea, Ivory Coast, Zambia and Rwanda.

== Life history ==
No host plant has been documented for this species.
