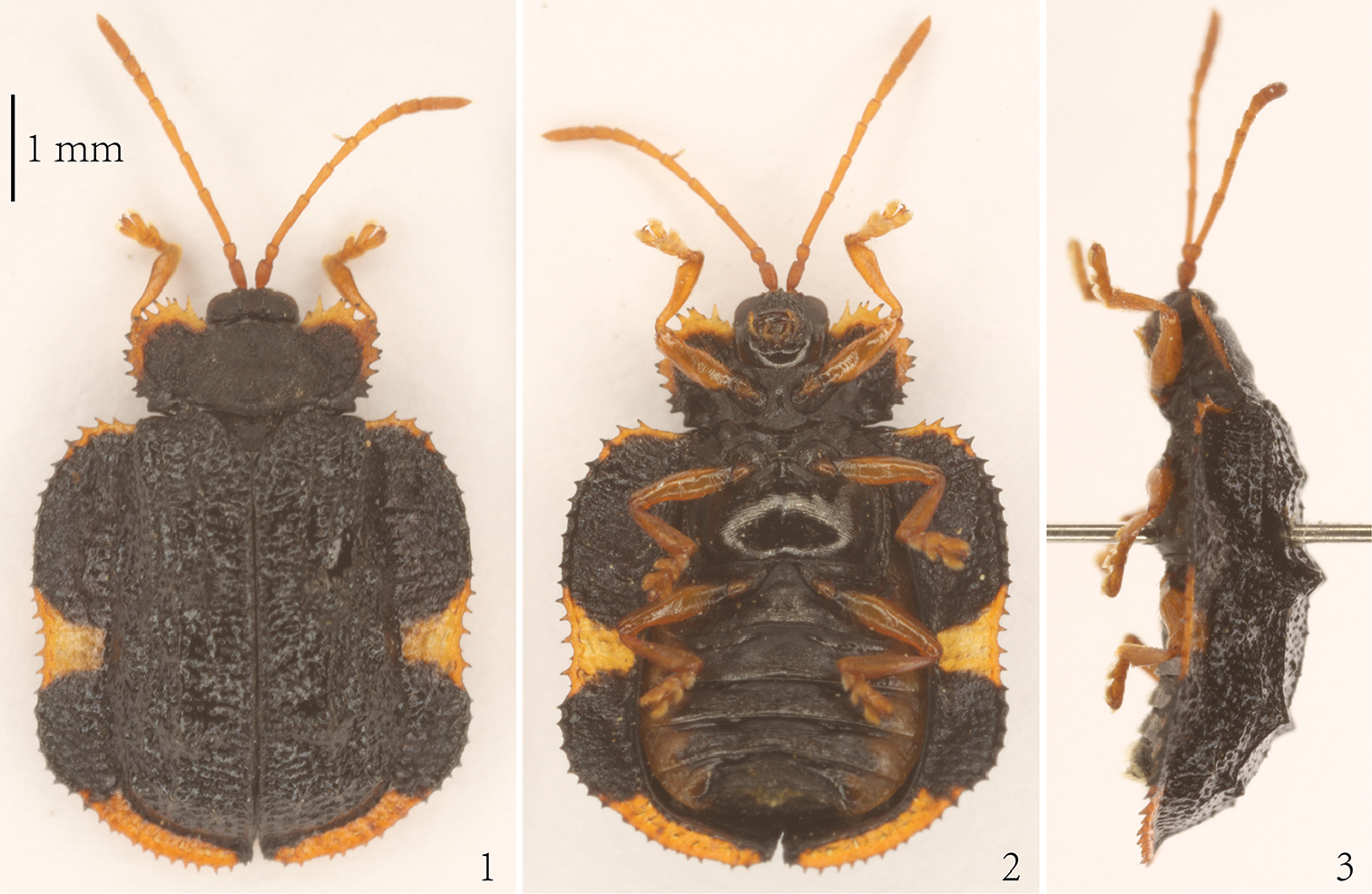

Scientific classification
- Kingdom: Animalia
- Phylum: Arthropoda
- Clade: Pancrustacea
- Class: Insecta
- Order: Coleoptera
- Suborder: Polyphaga
- Infraorder: Cucujiformia
- Family: Chrysomelidae
- Genus: Cassidispa
- Species: C. relicta

Binomial name
- Cassidispa relicta L. Medvedev, 1957

= Cassidispa relicta =

Species of beetle

Cassidispa relicta is a species of beetle of the family Chrysomelidae. It is found in Russia and China (Inner Mongolia).

== Description ==
Adults are mostly white, but the antennae and legs are brown, while the disc of the pronotum is black.

== Life history ==
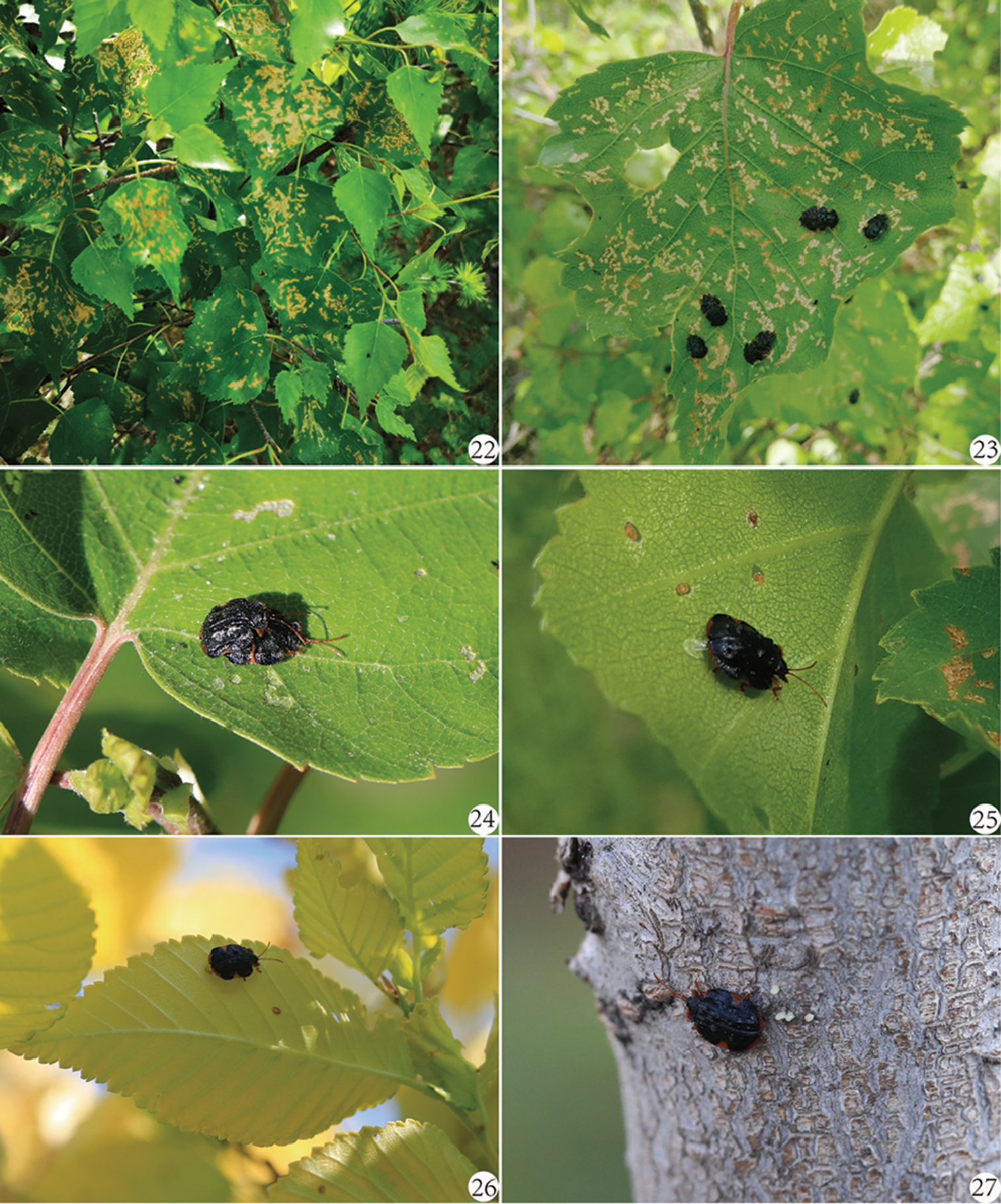
Life stages of Cassidispa relicta on host plants (all on Betula platyphylla except Fig. 26 on Ulmus pumila). 22–23 Adults and their feeding pattern; 24 Adults copulate on upper surface of host leaf; 25–26 Females laying eggs on lower surface of host leaves; 27 Female laying eggs on the tree trunk

The larvae mine in the leaves of Betula platyphylla and Ulmus pumila. The life cycle seems to be univoltine. The species overwinters as a mature larva until the temperature rises in the spring. Pupation takes place in fallen leaves in early April. The pupal stage lasts about one month, with adults emerging in late May. The adults feed on the mesophyllic tissue of the upper surface of the host leaves.
