= Thoracispa =

Scientific classification
- Kingdom: Animalia
- Phylum: Arthropoda
- Class: Insecta
- Order: Coleoptera
- Suborder: Polyphaga
- Infraorder: Cucujiformia
- Family: Chrysomelidae
- Subfamily: Cassidinae
- Tribe: Hispini
- Genus: Thoracispa; Chapuis, 1875

Synonyms
- Hispa (Thoracispa) Chapuis, 1875

Genus of leaf beetles

Thoracispa is a genus of beetles belonging to the family Chrysomelidae.

== Species ==
- Thoracispa brunni (Weise, 1904)
- Thoracispa dregei (Chapuis, 1875)
- Thoracispa hessei (Uhmann, 1934)
