= Cassidispa bipuncticollis =

Scientific classification
- Kingdom: Animalia
- Phylum: Arthropoda
- Clade: Pancrustacea
- Class: Insecta
- Order: Coleoptera
- Suborder: Polyphaga
- Infraorder: Cucujiformia
- Family: Chrysomelidae
- Genus: Cassidispa
- Species: C. bipuncticollis

Binomial name
- Cassidispa bipuncticollis Chen, 1941

Species of beetle

Cassidispa bipuncticollis is a species of beetle of the family Chrysomelidae. It is found in China (Hebei, Shanxi).

== Life history ==
The host plants for this species are Betula species.
