= Philodonta modesta =

Scientific classification
- Kingdom: Animalia
- Phylum: Arthropoda
- Class: Insecta
- Order: Coleoptera
- Suborder: Polyphaga
- Infraorder: Cucujiformia
- Family: Chrysomelidae
- Genus: Philodonta
- Species: P. modesta

Binomial name
- Philodonta modesta Weise, 1906

Species of beetle

Philodonta modesta is a species of beetle of the family Chrysomelidae. It is found in India (Pusa, Bellary) and Pakistan.

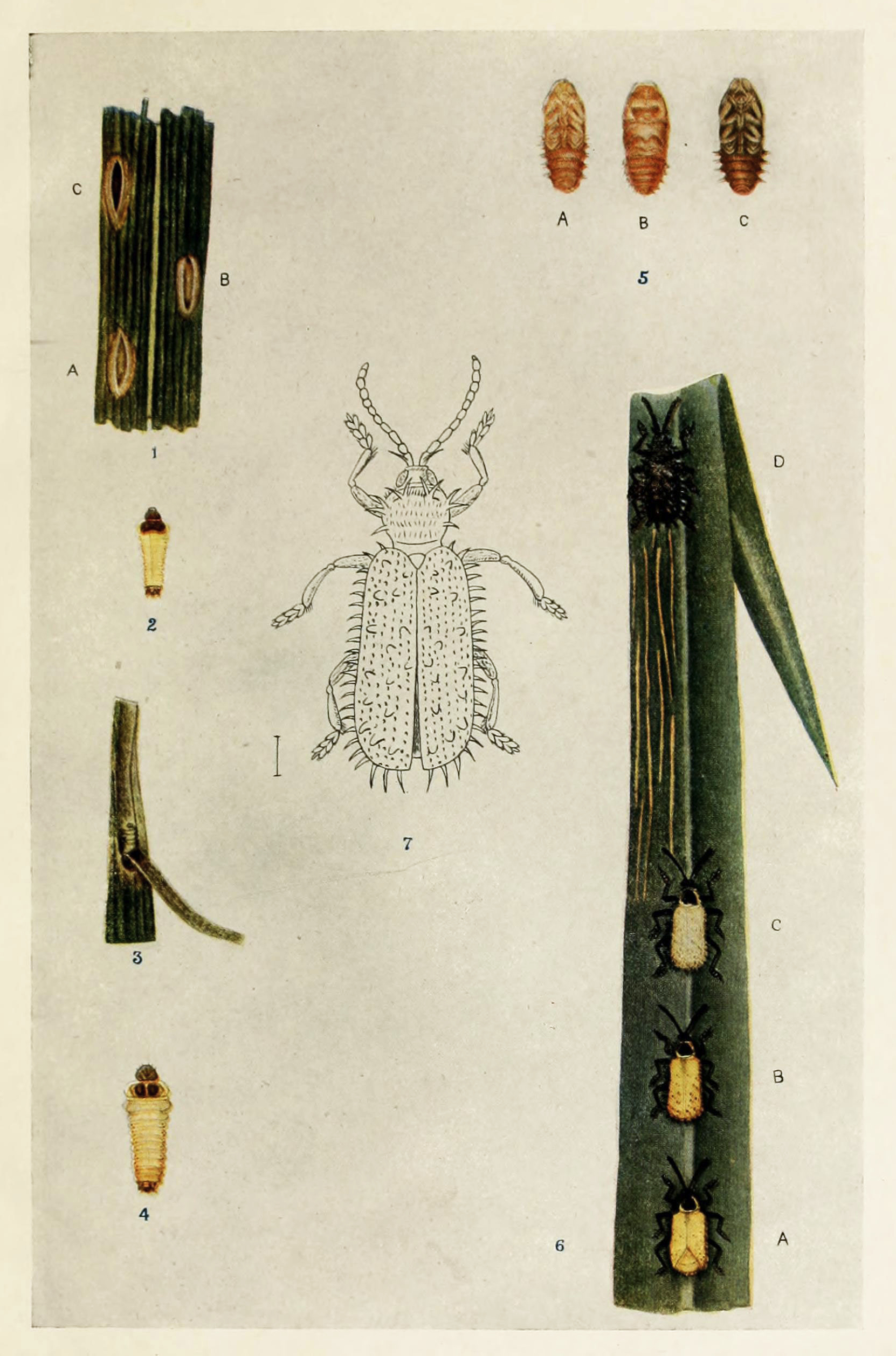

== Life history ==
The recorded host plants for this species are Saccharum officinarum, Andropogon sorghum, Sorghum vulgare, Avena sativa and Oryza sativa.
