= Rhadinosa machetes =

Scientific classification
- Kingdom: Animalia
- Phylum: Arthropoda
- Class: Insecta
- Order: Coleoptera
- Suborder: Polyphaga
- Infraorder: Cucujiformia
- Family: Chrysomelidae
- Genus: Rhadinosa
- Species: R. machetes

Binomial name
- Rhadinosa machetes (Gestro, 1898)

Synonyms
- Pseudispella machetes Gestro, 1898

Species of beetle

Rhadinosa machetes is a species of beetle of the family Chrysomelidae. It is found in India (Assam, Bengal) and Myanmar.

== Life history ==
No host plant has been documented for this species.
