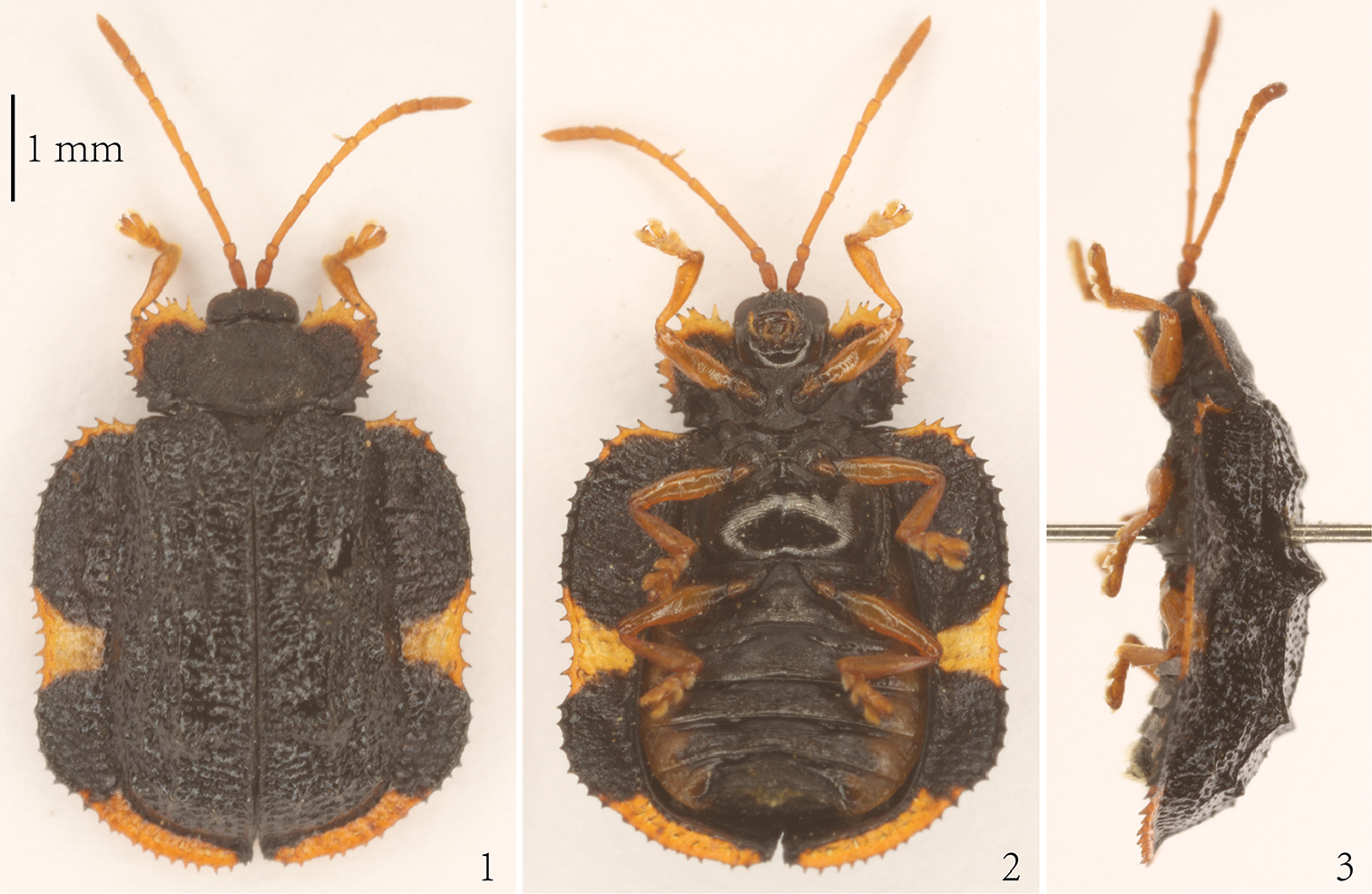
- Cassidispa relicta

Scientific classification
- Kingdom: Animalia
- Phylum: Arthropoda
- Clade: Pancrustacea
- Class: Insecta
- Order: Coleoptera
- Suborder: Polyphaga
- Infraorder: Cucujiformia
- Family: Chrysomelidae
- Subfamily: Cassidinae
- Tribe: Hispini
- Genus: Cassidispa; Gestro, 1899

= Cassidispa =

Genus of leaf beetles

Cassidispa is a genus of Asian leaf beetles belonging to the tribe Hispini.

== Species ==
- Cassidispa bipuncticollis Chen, 1941
- Cassidispa femoralis Chen & Yu, 1976
- Cassidispa granulosa Weise, 1911
- Cassidispa maderi Uhmann, 1938
- Cassidispa mirabilis Gestro, 1899
- Cassidispa reducta Uhmann, 1931
- Cassidispa relicta L. Medvedev, 1957
- Cassidispa simplex Uhmann, 1931
