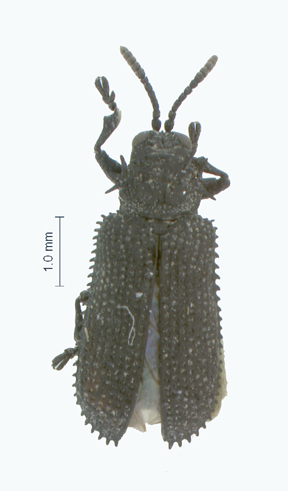

Scientific classification
- Kingdom: Animalia
- Phylum: Arthropoda
- Clade: Pancrustacea
- Class: Insecta
- Order: Coleoptera
- Suborder: Polyphaga
- Infraorder: Cucujiformia
- Family: Chrysomelidae
- Subfamily: Cassidinae
- Tribe: Hispini
- Genus: Callanispa; Uhmann, 1959
- Species: C. rasa

Binomial name
- Callanispa rasa Uhmann, 1959

= Callanispa =

Genus of beetles

Callanispa is a genus of leaf beetles in the family Chrysomelidae. It is monotypic, being represented by the single species, Callanispa rasa, which is found in South Africa.

== Life history ==
No host plant has been documented for this species.
