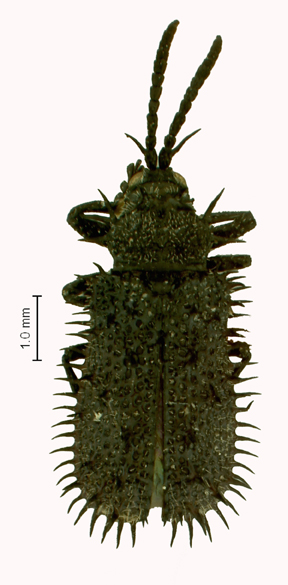

Scientific classification
- Kingdom: Animalia
- Phylum: Arthropoda
- Clade: Pancrustacea
- Class: Insecta
- Order: Coleoptera
- Suborder: Polyphaga
- Infraorder: Cucujiformia
- Family: Chrysomelidae
- Genus: Asamangulia
- Species: A. wakkeri

Binomial name
- Asamangulia wakkeri (Zehntner, 1896)

Synonyms
- Hispella wakkeri Zehntner, 1896

= Asamangulia wakkeri =

Species of beetle

Asamangulia wakkeri is a species of beetle of the family Chrysomelidae. It is found in Indonesia (Java).

== Life history ==
The recorded host plants for this species are bamboo, Saccharum officinarum, Oryza sativa and Phragmites australis.
