= Thoracispa brunni =

Scientific classification
- Kingdom: Animalia
- Phylum: Arthropoda
- Class: Insecta
- Order: Coleoptera
- Suborder: Polyphaga
- Infraorder: Cucujiformia
- Family: Chrysomelidae
- Genus: Thoracispa
- Species: T. brunni

Binomial name
- Thoracispa brunni (Weise, 1904)

Synonyms
- Hispa (Thoracispa) brunni Weise, 1904

Species of beetle

Thoracispa brunni is a species of beetle of the family Chrysomelidae. It is found in South Africa.

== Life history ==
No host plant has been documented for this species.
