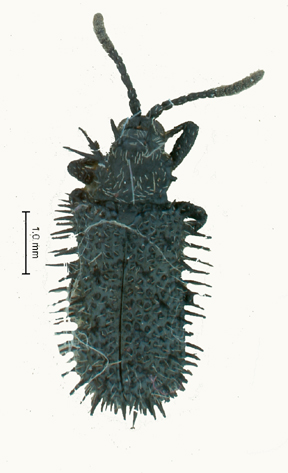

Scientific classification
- Kingdom: Animalia
- Phylum: Arthropoda
- Class: Insecta
- Order: Coleoptera
- Suborder: Polyphaga
- Infraorder: Cucujiformia
- Family: Chrysomelidae
- Genus: Pseudispella
- Species: P. militaris

Binomial name
- Pseudispella militaris (Weise, 1902)

Synonyms
- Hispellinus militaris Weise, 1902; Pseudhispella crampeli Achard, 1917

= Pseudispella militaris =

Species of beetle

Pseudispella militaris is a species of beetle of the family Chrysomelidae. It is found in Cameroon, Congo, Kenya, Zimbabwe, Rwanda and Uganda.

== Life history ==
No host plant has been documented for this species.
