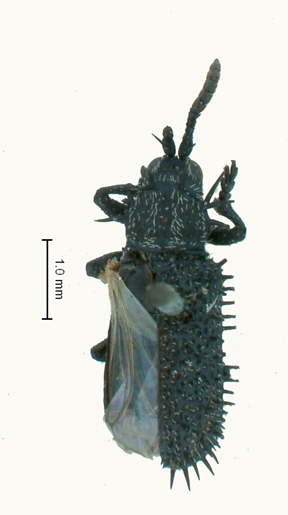

Scientific classification
- Kingdom: Animalia
- Phylum: Arthropoda
- Class: Insecta
- Order: Coleoptera
- Suborder: Polyphaga
- Infraorder: Cucujiformia
- Family: Chrysomelidae
- Genus: Polyconia
- Species: P. spinicornis

Binomial name
- Polyconia spinicornis (Kraatz, 1895)

Synonyms
- Hispella spinicornis Kraatz, 1895; Polyconia consobrina Péringuey, 1908

= Polyconia spinicornis =

Species of beetle

Polyconia spinicornis is a species of beetle of the family Chrysomelidae. It is found in Cameroon, Congo, Italy, Kenya, Mozambique, Niger, Zimbabwe, Senegal, South Africa, Spain and Uganda.

== Life history ==
The recorded host plant for this species is Zea mays.
