= Dorcathispa =

Scientific classification
- Kingdom: Animalia
- Phylum: Arthropoda
- Clade: Pancrustacea
- Class: Insecta
- Order: Coleoptera
- Suborder: Polyphaga
- Infraorder: Cucujiformia
- Family: Chrysomelidae
- Subfamily: Cassidinae
- Tribe: Hispini
- Genus: Dorcathispa; Weise, 1901

Synonyms
- Hispella (Cerathispa) Weise, 1900; Hispa (Podispa) Chapuis, 1875

Genus of leaf beetles

Dorcathispa is a genus of beetles belonging to the family Chrysomelidae.

== Species ==
- Dorcathispa alternata (Weise, 1900)
- Dorcathispa bellicosa (Guérin-Méneville, 1841)
- Dorcathispa extrema (Péringuey, 1898)
