= Pseudispella sulcicollis =

Scientific classification
- Kingdom: Animalia
- Phylum: Arthropoda
- Class: Insecta
- Order: Coleoptera
- Suborder: Polyphaga
- Infraorder: Cucujiformia
- Family: Chrysomelidae
- Genus: Pseudispella
- Species: P. sulcicollis

Binomial name
- Pseudispella sulcicollis (Gyllenhal, 1817)

Synonyms
- Hispa sulcicollis Gyllenhal, 1817

Species of beetle

Pseudispella sulcicollis is a species of beetle of the family Chrysomelidae. It is found in Guinea and Togo.

== Life history ==
No host plant has been documented for this species.
