= Monohispa tuberculata =

Scientific classification
- Kingdom: Animalia
- Phylum: Arthropoda
- Class: Insecta
- Order: Coleoptera
- Suborder: Polyphaga
- Infraorder: Cucujiformia
- Family: Chrysomelidae
- Genus: Monohispa
- Species: M. tuberculata

Binomial name
- Monohispa tuberculata (Gressitt, 1950)

Synonyms
- Dactylispa tuberculata Gressitt, 1950

Species of beetle

Monohispa tuberculata is a species of beetle of the family Chrysomelidae. It is found in China (Fujian, Guangdong, Guangxi, Yunnan).

== Life history ==
The recorded host plants for this species are Mallotus species.
