= Monohispa =

Scientific classification
- Kingdom: Animalia
- Phylum: Arthropoda
- Clade: Pancrustacea
- Class: Insecta
- Order: Coleoptera
- Suborder: Polyphaga
- Infraorder: Cucujiformia
- Family: Chrysomelidae
- Subfamily: Cassidinae
- Tribe: Hispini
- Genus: Monohispa; Weise, 1897

Synonyms
- Dactylispa (Monohispa) Weise, 1897

Genus of leaf beetles

Monohispa is a genus of beetles belonging to the family Chrysomelidae.

== Species ==
- Monohispa singularis (Gestro, 1888)
- Monohispa tuberculata (Gressitt, 1950)
