= Pseudispella discernenda =

Scientific classification
- Kingdom: Animalia
- Phylum: Arthropoda
- Class: Insecta
- Order: Coleoptera
- Suborder: Polyphaga
- Infraorder: Cucujiformia
- Family: Chrysomelidae
- Genus: Pseudispella
- Species: P. discernenda

Binomial name
- Pseudispella discernenda (Uhmann, 1949)

Synonyms
- Decispella discernenda Uhmann, 1949

Species of beetle

Pseudispella discernenda is a species of beetle of the family Chrysomelidae. It is found in Guinea, Rwanda, Senegal and Zimbabwe.

== Life history ==
No host plant has been documented for this species.
