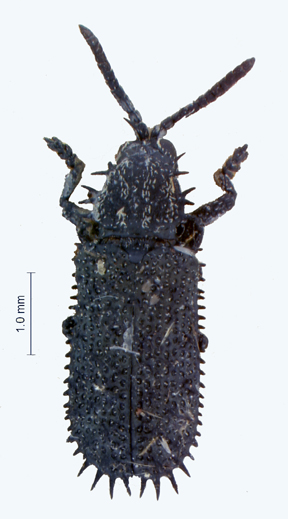

Scientific classification
- Kingdom: Animalia
- Phylum: Arthropoda
- Class: Insecta
- Order: Coleoptera
- Suborder: Polyphaga
- Infraorder: Cucujiformia
- Family: Chrysomelidae
- Genus: Philodonta
- Species: P. chirinda

Binomial name
- Philodonta chirinda Maulik, 1919

= Philodonta chirinda =

Species of beetle

Philodonta chirinda is a species of beetle of the family Chrysomelidae. It is found in Congo, Mozambique and Zimbabwe.

== Life history ==
No host plant has been documented for this species.
