= Asamangulia horni =

Scientific classification
- Kingdom: Animalia
- Phylum: Arthropoda
- Clade: Pancrustacea
- Class: Insecta
- Order: Coleoptera
- Suborder: Polyphaga
- Infraorder: Cucujiformia
- Family: Chrysomelidae
- Genus: Asamangulia
- Species: A. horni

Binomial name
- Asamangulia horni Uhmann, 1927

Species of beetle

Asamangulia horni is a species of beetle of the family Chrysomelidae. It is found in Taiwan.

== Life history ==
The recorded host plants for this species are Saccharum officinarum and Saccharum sinensis.
