= Chrysispa viridicyanea =

Scientific classification
- Kingdom: Animalia
- Phylum: Arthropoda
- Class: Insecta
- Order: Coleoptera
- Suborder: Polyphaga
- Infraorder: Cucujiformia
- Family: Chrysomelidae
- Genus: Chrysispa
- Species: C. viridicyanea

Binomial name
- Chrysispa viridicyanea (Kraatz, 1895)

Synonyms
- Hispa viridiaenea Kraatz, 1895; Hispa (Chrysispa) horni Uhmann, 1927

Species of beetle

Chrysispa viridicyanea is a species of beetle of the family Chrysomelidae. It is found in Namibia, Angola, Burundi, Cameroon, Congo, Ethiopia, Ghana, Guinea, Gabon, Kenya, Sierra Leone, Rwanda, Sudan, Tanzania and Uganda.

== Life history ==
The recorded host plants for this species are Vossia species, Oryza sativa and other grasses.

== Disease vector ==
Research has shown that this species is involved in the transmission of the rice yellow mottle virus.
