= Cassidispa simplex =

Scientific classification
- Kingdom: Animalia
- Phylum: Arthropoda
- Clade: Pancrustacea
- Class: Insecta
- Order: Coleoptera
- Suborder: Polyphaga
- Infraorder: Cucujiformia
- Family: Chrysomelidae
- Genus: Cassidispa
- Species: C. simplex

Binomial name
- Cassidispa simplex Uhmann, 1931

Species of beetle

Cassidispa simplex is a species of beetle of the family Chrysomelidae. It is found in Angola, the Democratic Republic of the Congo and Zimbabwe.

== Life history ==
No host plant has been documented for this species.
