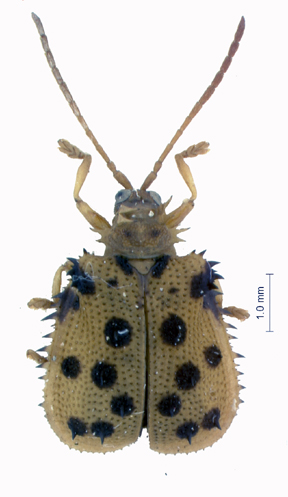

Scientific classification
- Kingdom: Animalia
- Phylum: Arthropoda
- Clade: Pancrustacea
- Class: Insecta
- Order: Coleoptera
- Suborder: Polyphaga
- Infraorder: Cucujiformia
- Family: Chrysomelidae
- Subfamily: Cassidinae
- Tribe: Hispini
- Genus: Jambhala; Würmli, 1975
- Species: J. nekula

Binomial name
- Jambhala nekula Würmli, 1975

= Jambhala (beetle) =

Genus of beetles

Jambhala is a genus of leaf beetles in the family Chrysomelidae. It is monotypic, being represented by the single species, Jambhala nekula, which is found in Bhutan and Nepal.

No host plant has been documented for this species.
