= Joseph Sugar Baly =

English doctor and entomologist (1816–1890)

- Born: 1816; Warwick, Warwickshire, England
- Died: 27 March 1890 (aged 73–74); Warwick, Warwickshire, England
- Occupations: Medical doctor and entomologist
- Known for: Described a number of species of beetle in the family Chrysomelidae

Joseph Sugar Baly MRCS FLS (1816 – 27 March 1890) was an English medical doctor and entomologist. He described a number of species of beetle in the family Chrysomelidae.

Baly was born in Warwick, first son of Joseph Baly. He studied at the local grammar school under Reverend George Innes. He then studied at St. George's Hospital and worked with Dr Burd at the Shrewsbury Infirmary. He also studied in Paris before practicing medicine at Leamington. He later established a large practice in London. He became interested in entomology in his thirties after taking up microscope studies. Baly became a specialist on the leaf-feeding beetles, then placed in the Coleoptera: Phytophaga. He mostly described species collected by others and was one of the first entomologists to examine the male genitalia of insects for species diagnosis.

He sold off his London practice in 1868 due to poor health and moved back to Warwick where he served as an honorary curator of the museum. He worked on the genus Diabrotica. He was a member of the Entomological Society of London from 1850 and was elected fellow of the Linnean Society in 1865. He sold his Cassidinae collections to E. W. Janson. His collection consisting of 28,000 specimens with 6,000 species including 1,551 types is in the Natural History Museum, London. One of the many species he described was Stethopachys formosa.

Baly had a son and five daughters. He died after a short illness at Warwick.

== Works ==
- Catalogue of the Hispidae in the Collection of the British Museum.
- (with George Champion) Insecta. Coleoptera. Phytophaga (part). Vol. VI, Pt. 2 (1885–1894) Biologia Centrali-Americana

== Other sources ==
- Anthony Musgrave (1932). Bibliography of Australian Entomology, 1775–1930, with biographical notes on authors and collectors, Royal Zoological Society of News South Wales (Sydney) : viii + 380.
- Sharp, D. 1890: [Baly, J. S.] L'Entomologiste 23 176, 197–200
