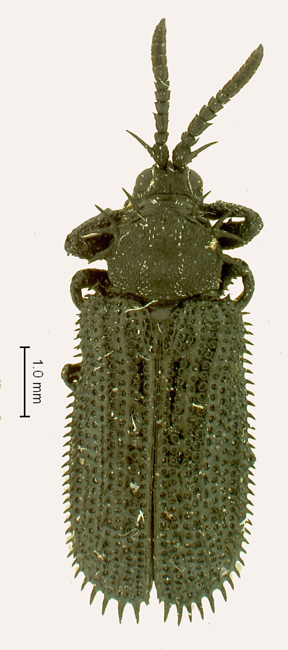

Scientific classification
- Kingdom: Animalia
- Phylum: Arthropoda
- Clade: Pancrustacea
- Class: Insecta
- Order: Coleoptera
- Suborder: Polyphaga
- Infraorder: Cucujiformia
- Family: Chrysomelidae
- Genus: Acmenychus
- Species: A. inermis

Binomial name
- Acmenychus inermis (Zubkoff, 1833)

Synonyms
- Hispa inermis Zubkoff, 1833; Monochirus potanini Weise, 1889

= Acmenychus inermis =

Species of beetle

Acmenychus inermis is a species of beetle of the family Chrysomelidae. It is found in Azerbaijan, China (Xinjiang), Iran, Kazakhstan, Mongolia, Nepal, Russia, Turkey, Turkmenistan and Tadzhikistan.

== Description ==
Adults reach a length of about 5.5-6.5 mm. They have an elongate body and are completely black. The elytra have four raised ribs, each armed with curved spines.

== Life history ==
The recorded host plants for this species are Phragmites communis and Phragmites australis.
