= Asamangulia tuberculosus =

Scientific classification
- Kingdom: Animalia
- Phylum: Arthropoda
- Clade: Pancrustacea
- Class: Insecta
- Order: Coleoptera
- Suborder: Polyphaga
- Infraorder: Cucujiformia
- Family: Chrysomelidae
- Genus: Asamangulia
- Species: A. tuberculosus

Binomial name
- Asamangulia tuberculosus Gressitt, 1950

Synonyms
- Hispa tuberculosus Motschulsky, 1861; Acmenychus tuberculosus

Species of beetle

Asamangulia tuberculosus is a species of beetle of the family Chrysomelidae. It is found in India and Nepal.

== Life history ==
No host plant has been documented for this species.
