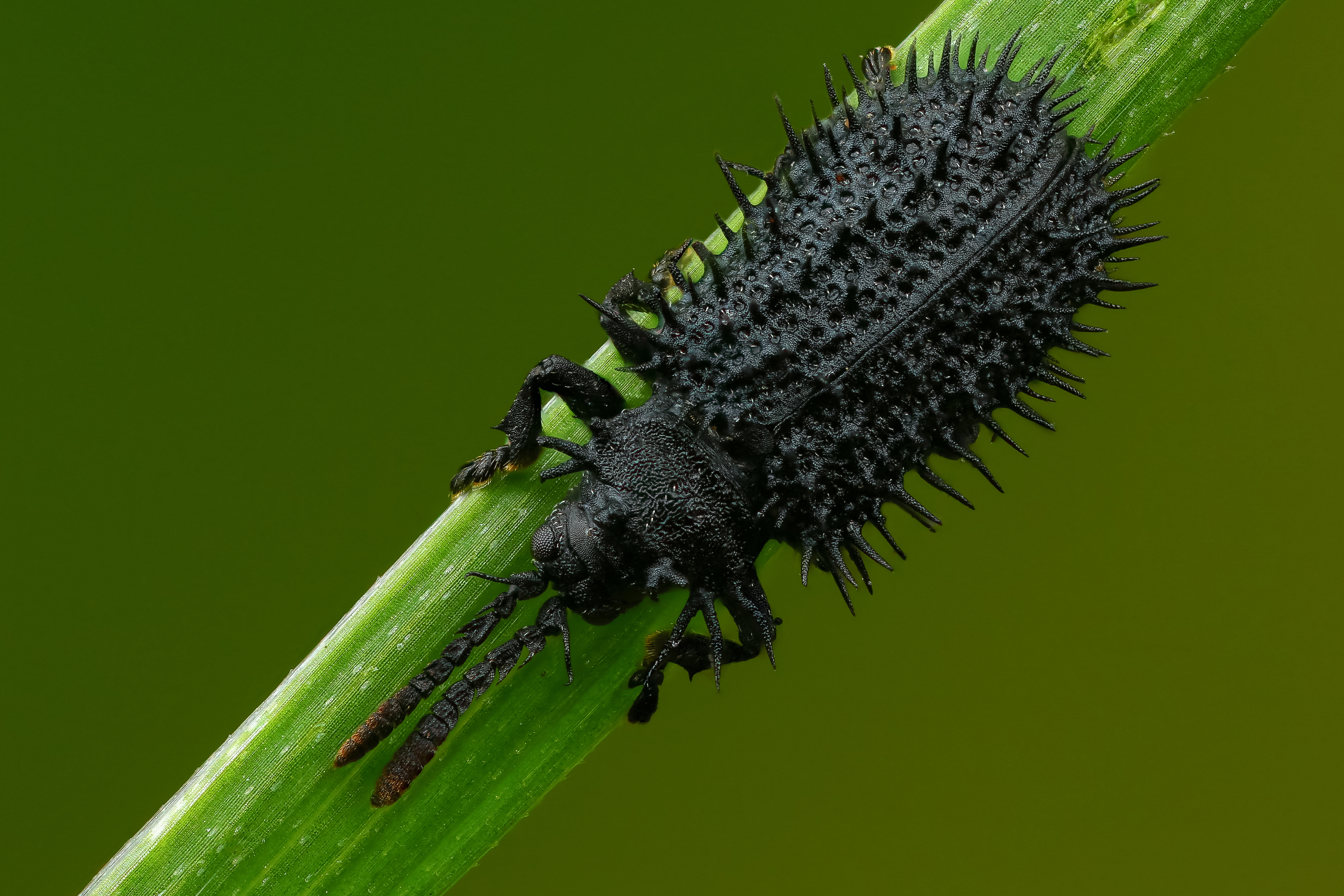
- Hispa atra

Scientific classification
- Kingdom: Animalia
- Phylum: Arthropoda
- Clade: Pancrustacea
- Class: Insecta
- Order: Coleoptera
- Suborder: Polyphaga
- Infraorder: Cucujiformia
- Family: Chrysomelidae
- Subfamily: Cassidinae
- Tribe: Hispini; Gyllenhal, 1813

Genera
- see text

Synonyms
- Monochirites Chapuis, 1875; Trichispites Chapuis, 1875

= Hispini =

Tribe of leaf beetles

Hispini is a tribe of leaf beetles within the subfamily Cassidinae. They were formerly treated as a tribe of the subfamily Hispinae, before Hispinae was found to be paraphyletic and merged with the Cassidinae. Their distribution is mainly within the Old World tropics and warmer parts of the Palaearctic. Many species feed on and breed on monocotyledonous hosts but some also use dicotyledons. The larvae of most species within the tribe are leaf miners.

== Genera ==
Genera within the tribe include:

1. Acmenychus Weise, 1905
2. Asamangulia Maulik, 1915
3. Callanispa Uhmann, 1959
4. Cassidispa Gestro, 1899
5. Chrysispa Weise, 1897
6. Dactylispa Weise, 1897
7. Dicladispa Gestro, 1897
8. Dorcathispa Weise, 1901
9. Hispa Linnaeus, 1767
10. Hispellinus Weise, 1897
11. Jambhala Würmli, 1975
12. Monohispa Weise, 1897
13. Phidodontina Uhmann, 1938
14. Philodonta Weise, 1906
15. Platypria Guérin-Ménéville, 1840
16. Pleurispa Weise, 1901
17. Polyconia Weise, 1905
18. Pseudispella Kraatz, 1895
19. Rhadinosa Weise, 1905
20. Rhodtrispa Chen & Tan, 1964
21. Sinispa Uhmann, 1940
22. Thomispa Würmli, 1975
23. Thoracispa Chapuis, 1875
24. Trichispa Chapuis, 1875
25. Unguispa Uhmann, 1954

== Selected former genera ==
1. Lesageana L. Medvedev, 2003
