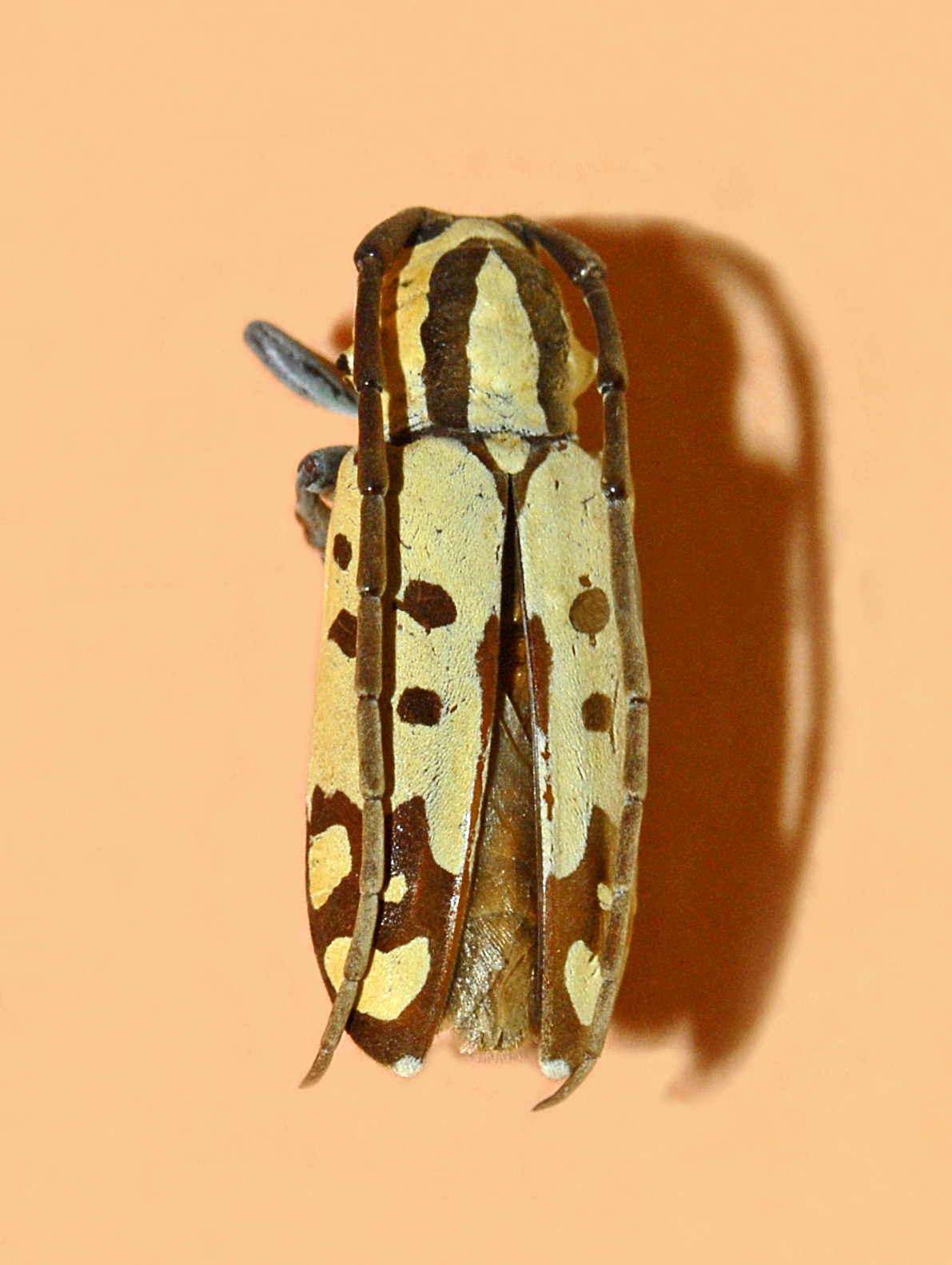
- Tragocephala variegata

Scientific classification
- Kingdom: Animalia
- Phylum: Arthropoda
- Class: Insecta
- Order: Coleoptera
- Suborder: Polyphaga
- Infraorder: Cucujiformia
- Family: Cerambycidae
- Subfamily: Lamiinae
- Tribe: Tragocephalini; Thomson, 1857

Genera
- See text

= Tragocephalini =

Tribe of beetles

Tragocephalini is a tribe of longhorn beetles of the subfamily Lamiinae. It was described by James Thomson in 1857.

== Taxonomy ==
- Anachariesthes Müller, 1949
- Anaplagiomus Téocchi, 1994
- Anatragus Kolbe, 1897
- Aparescus Kolbe, 1900
- Arianida Fairmaire, 1903
- Armatosterna Jordan, 1894
- Auriolus Lepesme, 1947
- Baliesthes Gahan, 1894
- Baliesthoides Breuning, 1958
- Breuningiana Strand, 1936
- Callimation Blanchard, 1844
- Cedemon Gahan, 1890
- Chariesthes Chevrolat, 1858
- Chariesthoides Breuning, 1938
- Chemsakiellus Villiers, 1982
- Cornuchariesthes Breuning, 1981
- Dinocephaloides Breuning, 1951
- Dinocephalus Peringuey, 1899
- Dodechariesthes Teocchi & al., 2010
- Falsonyctopais Lepesme, 1949
- Falsotragiscus Breuning, 1955
- Graciella Jordan, 1894
- Isochariesthes Téocchi, 1993
- Kerochariesthes Teocchi, 1989
- Melanopais Aurivillius, 1927
- Mimochariesthes Teocchi, 1985
- Mimolagrida Breuning, 1947
- Murosternum Jordan, 1934
- Neochariesthes Breuning & Téocchi, 1982
- Nyctopais Thomson, 1858
- Ontochariesthes Teocchi, 1992
- Paracedemon Breuning, 1942
- Parachariesthes Breuning, 1934
- Paradinocephalus Breuning, 1954
- Paragraciella Breuning, 1934
- Paramurosternum Breuning, 1936
- Paraphosphorus Linell, 1896
- Paraplagiomus Breuning & Teocchi, 1980
- Parasolymus Breuning, 1934
- Paraspilotragus Breuning, 1970
- Phosphorus Thomson, 1857
- Phymasterna Laporte de Castelnau, 1840
- Plagiomus Quedenfeldt, 1888
- Poimenesperus Thomson, 1857
- Pseudimalmus Breuning, 1934
- Pseudochariesthes Breuning, 1934
- Pseudophosphorus Breuning, 1934
- Pseudotragiscus Breuning, 1934
- Pseudotragocephala Breuning, 1934
- Rhaphidopsis Gerstäcker, 1855
- Scapochariesthes Breuning, 1948
- Solymus Lacordaire, 1872
- Spilotragoides Breuning, 1981
- Spilotragus Jordan, 1903
- Spinochariesthes Breuning, 1970
- Tragiscoschema Thomson, 1857
- Tragocephala Laporte de Castelnau, 1840
- Tragostoma Aurivillius, 1914
- Tragostomoides Breuning, 1954
