= Phosphorus (disambiguation) =

Phosphorus is a chemical element with symbol P and atomic number 15.

Phosphorus may also refer to:

- Phosphorus (morning star), the Morning Star, the planet Venus in its morning appearance
- Phosphorus (horse)
- Phosphorus (beetle), a genus of longhorn beetles
- Phosphorus (Thrace), a town of ancient Thrace, now in Turkey
- Phosphorus, an Iranian Cybercrime group

== See also ==
- Doctor Phosphorus, a Batman villain
- Isotopes of phosphorus
- P (disambiguation)
- Phosphorous (disambiguation), adjectival form of the element's name
- Phosphor
- Phosphorescence
