= Armatosterna castelnaudi =

Scientific classification
- Kingdom: Animalia
- Phylum: Arthropoda
- Class: Insecta
- Order: Coleoptera
- Suborder: Polyphaga
- Infraorder: Cucujiformia
- Family: Cerambycidae
- Genus: Armatosterna
- Species: A. castelnaudi

Binomial name
- Armatosterna castelnaudi (Thomson, 1865)

Synonyms
- Armatosterna natalensis Distant, 1906; Callimation castelnaudii Thomson, 1865

Species of beetle

Armatosterna castelnaudi is a species of beetle in the family Cerambycidae. It was described by Thomson in 1865, originally under the genus Callimation. It is known from South Africa, Botswana, the Democratic Republic of the Congo, Burundi, Zimbabwe, and Gabon.

== Subspecies ==
- Armatosterna castelnaudii castelnaudii (Thomson, 1865)
- Armatosterna castelnaudii crassicornis Téocchi, Jiroux & Sudre, 2004
