= Graciella albomaculata =

Scientific classification
- Kingdom: Animalia
- Phylum: Arthropoda
- Class: Insecta
- Order: Coleoptera
- Suborder: Polyphaga
- Infraorder: Cucujiformia
- Family: Cerambycidae
- Subfamily: Lamiinae
- Tribe: Tragocephalini
- Genus: Graciella
- Species: G. albomaculata

Binomial name
- Graciella albomaculata (Breuning, 1952)

Synonyms
- Falsochariesthes albomaculatus Breuning, 1952

Species of beetle

Graciella albomaculata is a species of Long-Horned Beetle in the beetle family Cerambycidae. It is found in the Democratic Republic of the Congo.

This species was described by Stephan von Breuning in 1952.
