= Graciella nigromarginata =

Scientific classification
- Domain: Eukaryota
- Kingdom: Animalia
- Phylum: Arthropoda
- Class: Insecta
- Order: Coleoptera
- Suborder: Polyphaga
- Infraorder: Cucujiformia
- Family: Cerambycidae
- Subfamily: Lamiinae
- Tribe: Tragocephalini
- Genus: Graciella
- Species: G. nigromarginata

Binomial name
- Graciella nigromarginata Hintz, 1912

Species of beetle

Graciella nigromarginata is a species of flat-faced longhorn in the beetle family Cerambycidae. It is found in Equatorial Guinea.
