= Graciella moea =

Scientific classification
- Domain: Eukaryota
- Kingdom: Animalia
- Phylum: Arthropoda
- Class: Insecta
- Order: Coleoptera
- Suborder: Polyphaga
- Infraorder: Cucujiformia
- Family: Cerambycidae
- Subfamily: Lamiinae
- Tribe: Tragocephalini
- Genus: Graciella
- Species: G. moea

Binomial name
- Graciella moea Jordan, 1903

Synonyms
- Graciella latevittata Hintz, 1912; Graciella moea flavomaculata Breuning, 1970

Species of beetle

Graciella moea is a species of flat-faced longhorn in the beetle family Cerambycidae. It is found in Gabon, Togo, the Central African Republic, Cameroon, and the Republic of the Congo.

This species was described by Karl Jordan in 1903.
