= Graciella brunneomaculata =

Scientific classification
- Domain: Eukaryota
- Kingdom: Animalia
- Phylum: Arthropoda
- Class: Insecta
- Order: Coleoptera
- Suborder: Polyphaga
- Infraorder: Cucujiformia
- Family: Cerambycidae
- Subfamily: Lamiinae
- Tribe: Tragocephalini
- Genus: Graciella
- Species: G. brunneomaculata

Binomial name
- Graciella brunneomaculata Hintz, 1912

Synonyms
- Graciella brunneomaculata accessoria Breuning, 1967

Species of beetle

Graciella brunneomaculata is a species of Long-Horned Beetle in the beetle family Cerambycidae. It is found in the African nations of Cameroon, Ivory Coast, and Sierra Leone.
