= Graciella circulum =

Scientific classification
- Domain: Eukaryota
- Kingdom: Animalia
- Phylum: Arthropoda
- Class: Insecta
- Order: Coleoptera
- Suborder: Polyphaga
- Infraorder: Cucujiformia
- Family: Cerambycidae
- Subfamily: Lamiinae
- Tribe: Tragocephalini
- Genus: Graciella
- Species: G. circulum

Binomial name
- Graciella circulum Báguena, 1952

Species of beetle

Graciella circulum is a species of flat-faced longhorn in the beetle family Cerambycidae. It is found in Bioko, in Equatorial Guinea.
