= Graciella epipleuralis =

Scientific classification
- Kingdom: Animalia
- Phylum: Arthropoda
- Class: Insecta
- Order: Coleoptera
- Suborder: Polyphaga
- Infraorder: Cucujiformia
- Family: Cerambycidae
- Subfamily: Lamiinae
- Tribe: Tragocephalini
- Genus: Graciella
- Species: G. epipleuralis

Binomial name
- Graciella epipleuralis (Breuning, 1950)

Synonyms
- Falsochariesthes epipleuralis Breuning, 1950; Graciella compacta Breuning, 1960

Species of beetle

Graciella epipleuralis is a species of beetle in the family Cerambycidae. It was described by Stephan von Breuning in 1950. It is known from Cameroon.
