= Graciella mariettae =

Scientific classification
- Kingdom: Animalia
- Phylum: Arthropoda
- Class: Insecta
- Order: Coleoptera
- Suborder: Polyphaga
- Infraorder: Cucujiformia
- Family: Cerambycidae
- Subfamily: Lamiinae
- Tribe: Tragocephalini
- Genus: Graciella
- Species: G. mariettae

Binomial name
- Graciella mariettae Lepesme & Breuning, 1955

Synonyms
- Graciella mariettae arcuata Teocchi & Sudre, 2003

Species of beetle

Graciella mariettae is a species of flat-faced longhorn in the beetle family Cerambycidae. It is found in Ivory Coast, Cameroon, and Gabon.

This species was described by Lepesme and Stephan von Breuning in 1955.
