= Graciella circuloides =

Scientific classification
- Domain: Eukaryota
- Kingdom: Animalia
- Phylum: Arthropoda
- Class: Insecta
- Order: Coleoptera
- Suborder: Polyphaga
- Infraorder: Cucujiformia
- Family: Cerambycidae
- Subfamily: Lamiinae
- Tribe: Tragocephalini
- Genus: Graciella
- Species: G. circuloides

Binomial name
- Graciella circuloides Teocchi, 1997

Species of beetle

Graciella circuloides is a species of Long-Horned Beetle in the beetle family Cerambycidae. It is found in Cameroon and the Central African Republic.

This species was described by Pierre Téocchi in 1997.
