= Graciella flavovittata =

Scientific classification
- Domain: Eukaryota
- Kingdom: Animalia
- Phylum: Arthropoda
- Class: Insecta
- Order: Coleoptera
- Suborder: Polyphaga
- Infraorder: Cucujiformia
- Family: Cerambycidae
- Subfamily: Lamiinae
- Tribe: Tragocephalini
- Genus: Graciella
- Species: G. flavovittata

Binomial name
- Graciella flavovittata Teocchi & Sudre, 2003

Species of beetle

Graciella flavovittata is a species of flat-faced longhorn beetle in the family Cerambycidae. It is found in the Central African Republic.

This species was described by Pierre Téocchi and Jérôme Sudre in 2003.
