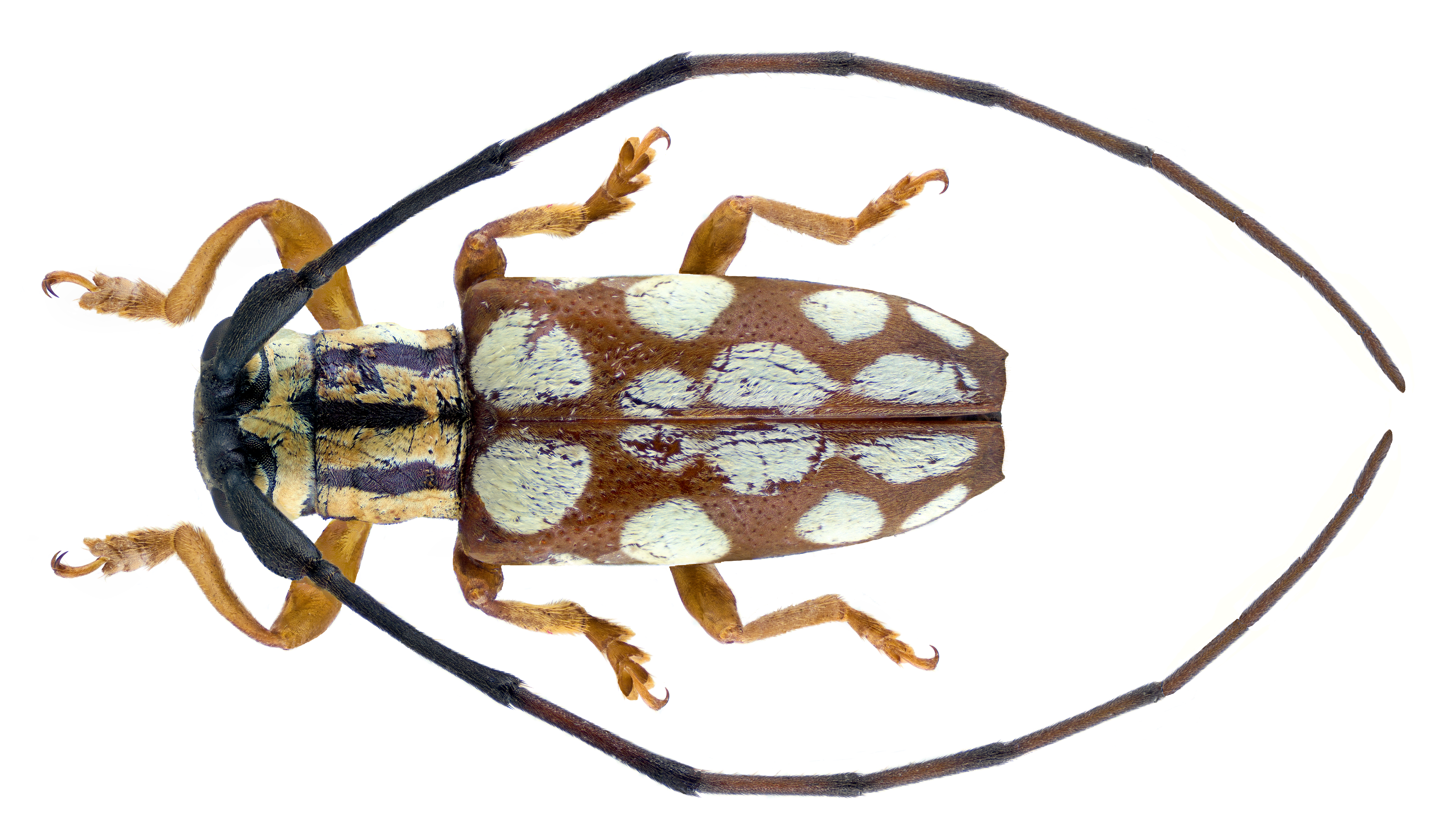

Scientific classification
- Domain: Eukaryota
- Kingdom: Animalia
- Phylum: Arthropoda
- Class: Insecta
- Order: Coleoptera
- Suborder: Polyphaga
- Infraorder: Cucujiformia
- Family: Cerambycidae
- Subfamily: Lamiinae
- Tribe: Tragocephalini
- Genus: Graciella
- Species: G. pulchella

Binomial name
- Graciella pulchella (Klug, 1835)

Synonyms
- Chariesthes concinnus var. senegalensis Chevrolat, 1858; Charinotus pulchellus (Klug) Thomson, 1858; Graciella concinna var. senegalensis (Chevrolat) Hintz, 1912; Saperda pulchella Klug, 1835

= Graciella pulchella =

Species of beetle

Graciella pulchella is a species of beetle in the family Cerambycidae. It feeds on Theobroma cacao, and has a wide distribution in Sub-Saharan Africa.

This species was described by Johann Christoph Friedrich Klug in 1835, originally under the genus Saperda.
