= Graciella compacta =

Scientific classification
- Domain: Eukaryota
- Kingdom: Animalia
- Phylum: Arthropoda
- Class: Insecta
- Order: Coleoptera
- Suborder: Polyphaga
- Infraorder: Cucujiformia
- Family: Cerambycidae
- Subfamily: Lamiinae
- Tribe: Tragocephalini
- Genus: Graciella
- Species: G. compacta

Binomial name
- Graciella compacta Jordan, 1894

Synonyms
- Graciella compacta discomaculata Breuning, 1977; Graciella trivittata Aurivillius, 1914

Species of beetle

Graciella compacta is a species of flat-faced longhorn in the beetle family Cerambycidae. It is found in Sub-Saharan Africa.

This species was described by Karl Jordan in 1894.

== Subspecies ==
These three subspecies belong to the species Graciella compacta:

- Graciella compacta compacta
- Graciella compacta marmorata (Fairmaire, 1897) (Madagascar)
- Graciella compacta zanzibarica Jordan, 1894 (Kenya and Zanzibar)
