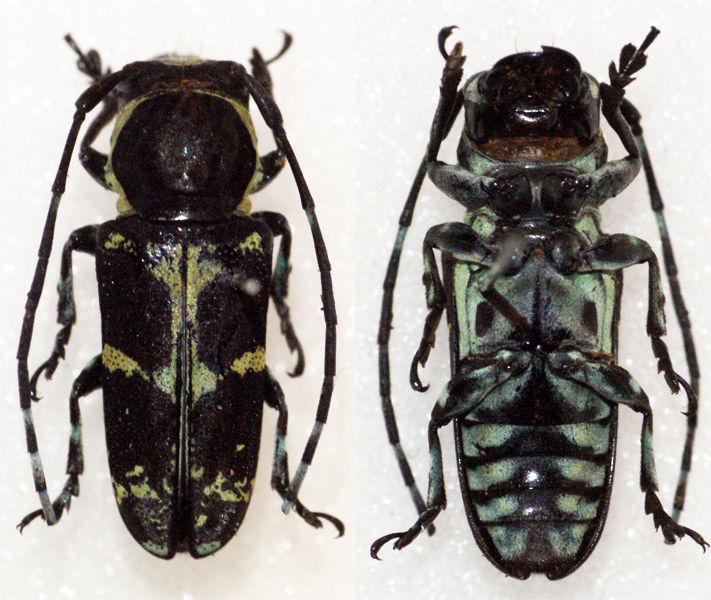

Scientific classification
- Kingdom: Animalia
- Phylum: Arthropoda
- Class: Insecta
- Order: Coleoptera
- Suborder: Polyphaga
- Infraorder: Cucujiformia
- Family: Cerambycidae
- Genus: Nyctopais
- Species: N. mysticus

Binomial name
- Nyctopais mysticus Jordan, 1894

= Nyctopais mysticus =

Species of beetle

Nyctopais mysticus is a species of beetle in the family Cerambycidae. It was described by Karl Jordan in 1894. It is known from Ghana, Cameroon, Gabon, Benin, Nigeria, the Democratic Republic of the Congo, and Togo. It contains the variety Nyctopais mysticus var. itzingeri.
