= Nyctopais burgeoni =

Scientific classification
- Kingdom: Animalia
- Phylum: Arthropoda
- Class: Insecta
- Order: Coleoptera
- Suborder: Polyphaga
- Infraorder: Cucujiformia
- Family: Cerambycidae
- Genus: Nyctopais
- Species: N. burgeoni

Binomial name
- Nyctopais burgeoni Breuning, 1934

Species of beetle

Nyctopais burgeoni is a species of beetle in the family Cerambycidae. It was described by Stephan von Breuning in 1934. It is known from the Democratic Republic of the Congo.
