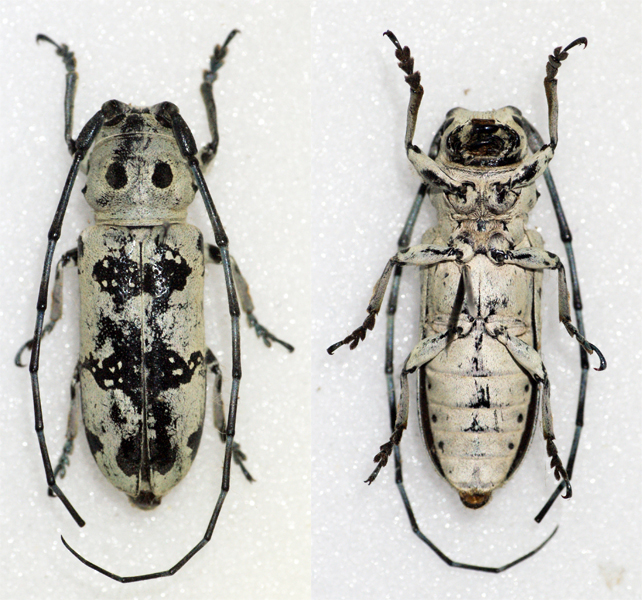
- Sex: Female

Scientific classification
- Kingdom: Animalia
- Phylum: Arthropoda
- Class: Insecta
- Order: Coleoptera
- Suborder: Polyphaga
- Infraorder: Cucujiformia
- Family: Cerambycidae
- Tribe: Tragocephalini
- Genus: Rhaphidopsis

= Rhaphidopsis =

Genus of beetles

Rhaphidopsis is a genus of longhorn beetles of the subfamily Lamiinae, containing the following species:

- Rhaphidopsis melaleuca Gerstäcker, 1855
- Rhaphidopsis zonaria (Thomson, 1857)
