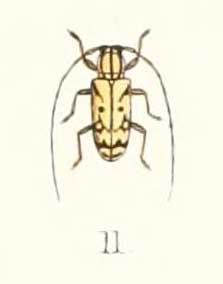
- Murosternum pentagonale

Scientific classification
- Kingdom: Animalia
- Phylum: Arthropoda
- Class: Insecta
- Order: Coleoptera
- Suborder: Polyphaga
- Infraorder: Cucujiformia
- Family: Cerambycidae
- Subfamily: Lamiinae
- Tribe: Tragocephalini
- Genus: Murosternum; Jordan, 1894

= Murosternum =

Genus of beetles

Murosternum is a genus of longhorn beetles of the subfamily Lamiinae, containing the following species:

- Murosternum latefasciatum Breuning, 1938
- Murosternum mocquerysi Jordan, 1894
- Murosternum molitor Jordan, 1894
- Murosternum paramolitor Breuning, 1968
- Murosternum pentagonale Jordan, 1894
- Murosternum pulchellum (Dalman, 1817)
