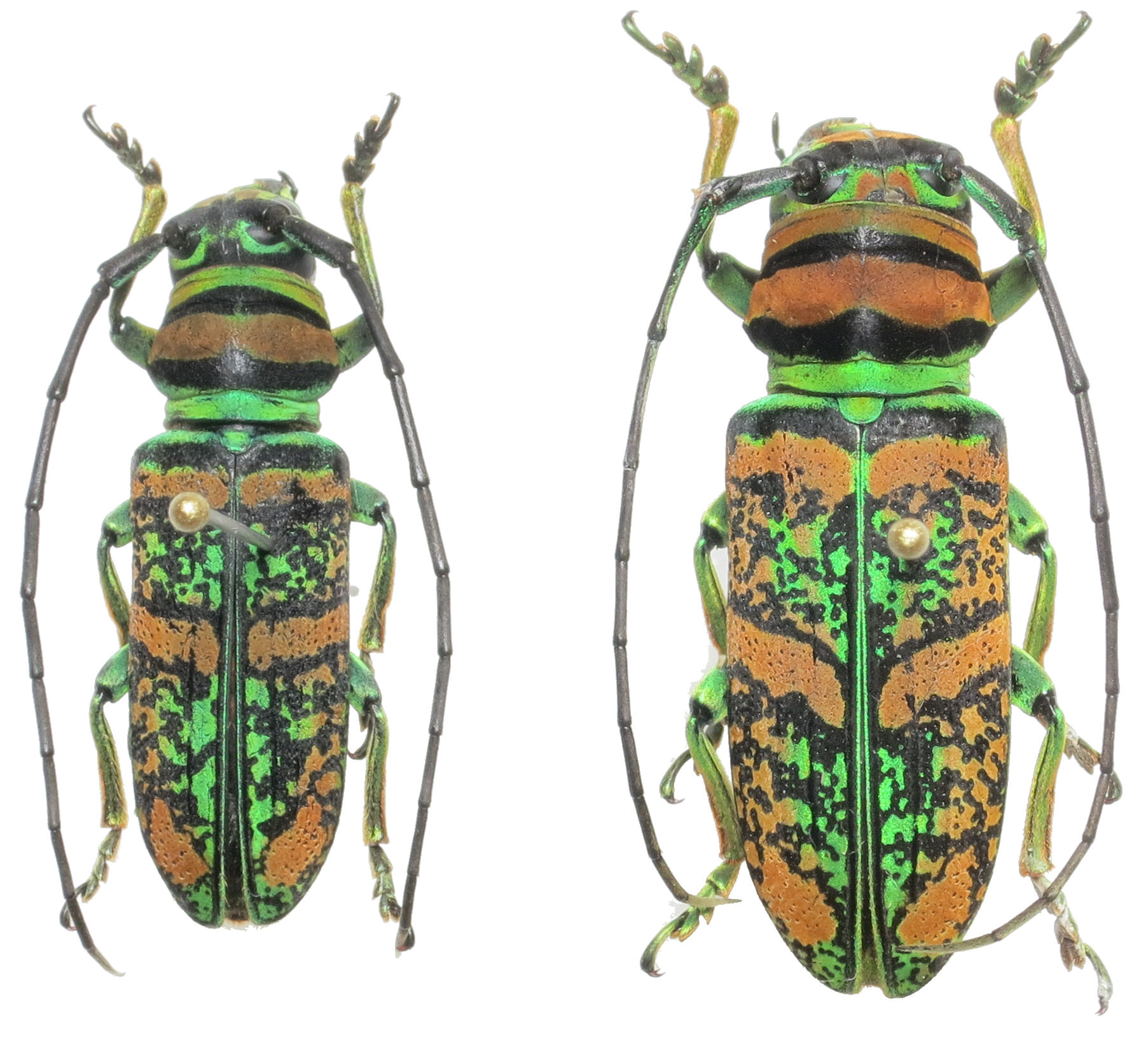
- Anatragus pulchellus from Togo

Scientific classification
- Kingdom: Animalia
- Phylum: Arthropoda
- Class: Insecta
- Order: Coleoptera
- Suborder: Polyphaga
- Infraorder: Cucujiformia
- Family: Cerambycidae
- Genus: Anatragus
- Species: A. pulchellus

Binomial name
- Anatragus pulchellus (Westwood, 1845)

Synonyms
- Lamia (Tragocephala) pulchella Westwood, 1845 nec Dalman, 1817; Tragocephala pulchella (Westwood, 1845)

= Anatragus pulchellus =

Species of beetle

Anatragus pulchellus is a species of beetle in the family Cerambycidae. It was described by John O. Westwood in 1845. It has a wide distribution in Africa.
