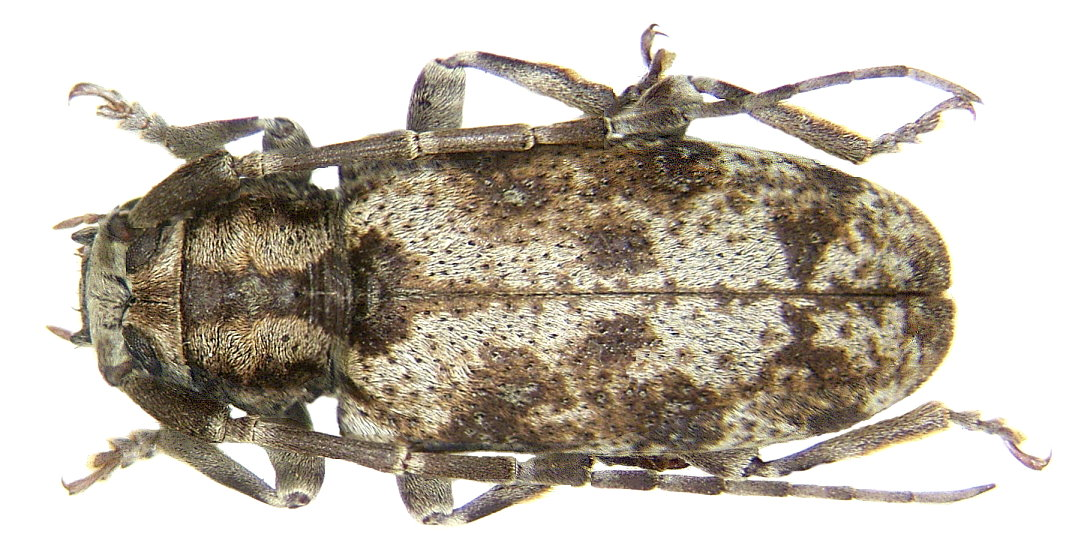
- Ontochariesthes namibianus

Scientific classification
- Kingdom: Animalia
- Phylum: Arthropoda
- Class: Insecta
- Order: Coleoptera
- Suborder: Polyphaga
- Infraorder: Cucujiformia
- Family: Cerambycidae
- Tribe: Tragocephalini
- Genus: Ontochariesthes

= Ontochariesthes =

Genus of beetles

Ontochariesthes is a genus of longhorn beetles of the subfamily Lamiinae, containing the following species:

- Ontochariesthes erongoensis Adlbauer, 1996
- Ontochariesthes namibianus Adlbauer, 1996
- Ontochariesthes unicolor (Breuning, 1953)
