= Callimation pontificum =

Scientific classification
- Kingdom: Animalia
- Phylum: Arthropoda
- Class: Insecta
- Order: Coleoptera
- Suborder: Polyphaga
- Infraorder: Cucujiformia
- Family: Cerambycidae
- Genus: Callimation
- Species: C. pontificum

Binomial name
- Callimation pontificum Thomson, 1857

Synonyms
- Callimation gracile Jordan, 1894

Species of beetle

Callimation pontificum is a species of beetle in the family Cerambycidae. It was described by James Thomson in 1857. It is known from Guinea and the Central African Republic.
