= Paraphosphorus =

Scientific classification
- Kingdom: Animalia
- Phylum: Arthropoda
- Class: Insecta
- Order: Coleoptera
- Suborder: Polyphaga
- Infraorder: Cucujiformia
- Family: Cerambycidae
- Tribe: Tragocephalini
- Genus: Paraphosphorus

Genus of beetles

Paraphosphorus is a genus of longhorn beetles of the subfamily Lamiinae, containing the following species:

- Paraphosphorus bipunctatus (Gahan, 1902)
- Paraphosphorus hololeucus Linell, 1896
