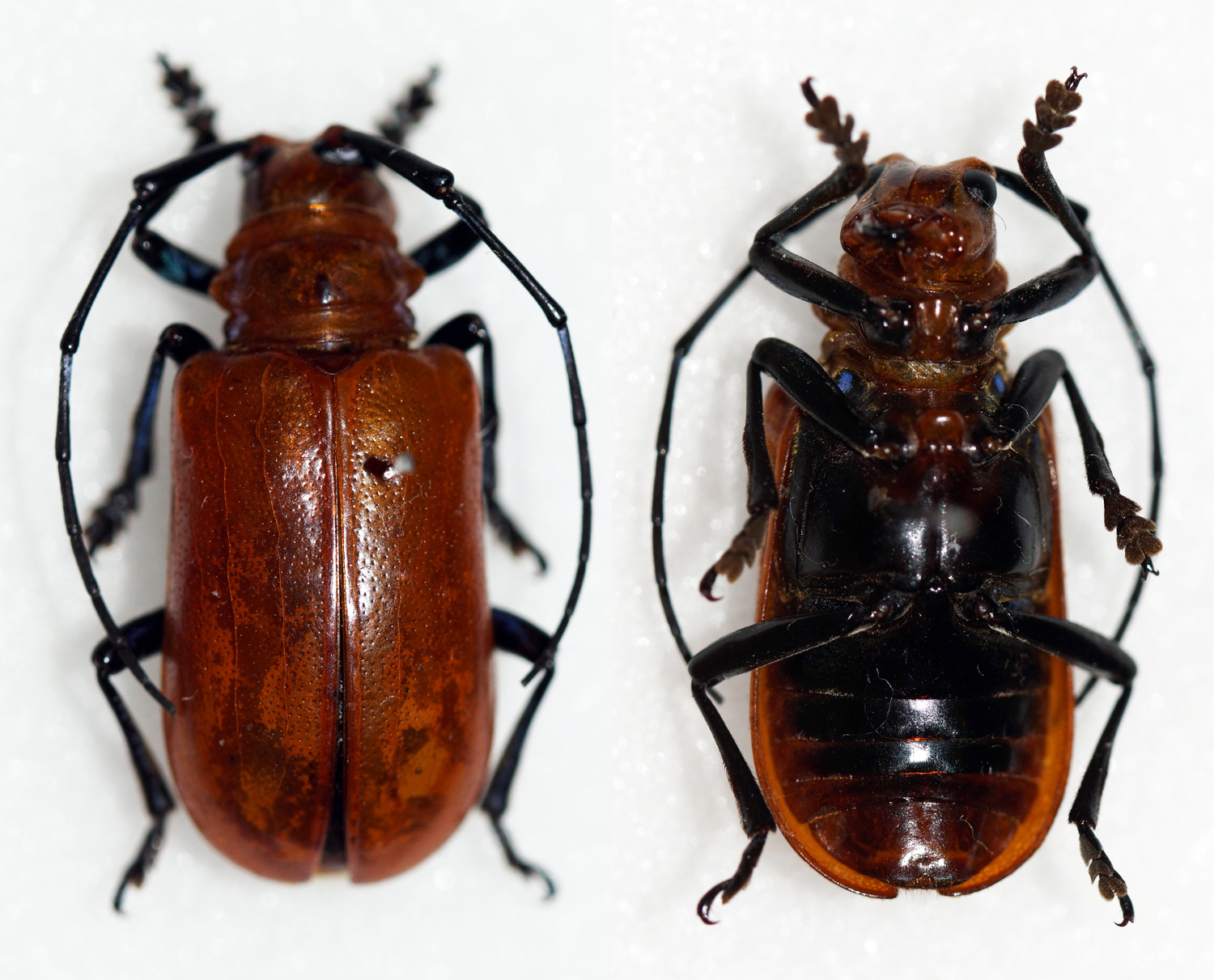

Scientific classification
- Kingdom: Animalia
- Phylum: Arthropoda
- Class: Insecta
- Order: Coleoptera
- Suborder: Polyphaga
- Infraorder: Cucujiformia
- Family: Cerambycidae
- Subfamily: Lamiinae
- Tribe: Tragocephalini
- Genus: Aparescus; Kolbe, 1900
- Species: A. praecox

Binomial name
- Aparescus praecox Kolbe, 1900

= Aparescus =

Genus of beetles

Aparescus praecox is a species of beetle in the family Cerambycidae, and the only species in the genus Aparescus. It was described by Hermann Julius Kolbe in 1900.
