= Dinocephaloides ochreomaculatus =

Scientific classification
- Kingdom: Animalia
- Phylum: Arthropoda
- Class: Insecta
- Order: Coleoptera
- Suborder: Polyphaga
- Infraorder: Cucujiformia
- Family: Cerambycidae
- Genus: Dinocephaloides
- Species: D. ochreomaculatus

Binomial name
- Dinocephaloides ochreomaculatus Breuning, 1951

Species of beetle

Dinocephaloides ochreomaculatus is a species of beetle in the family Cerambycidae. It was described by Stephan von Breuning in 1951.
