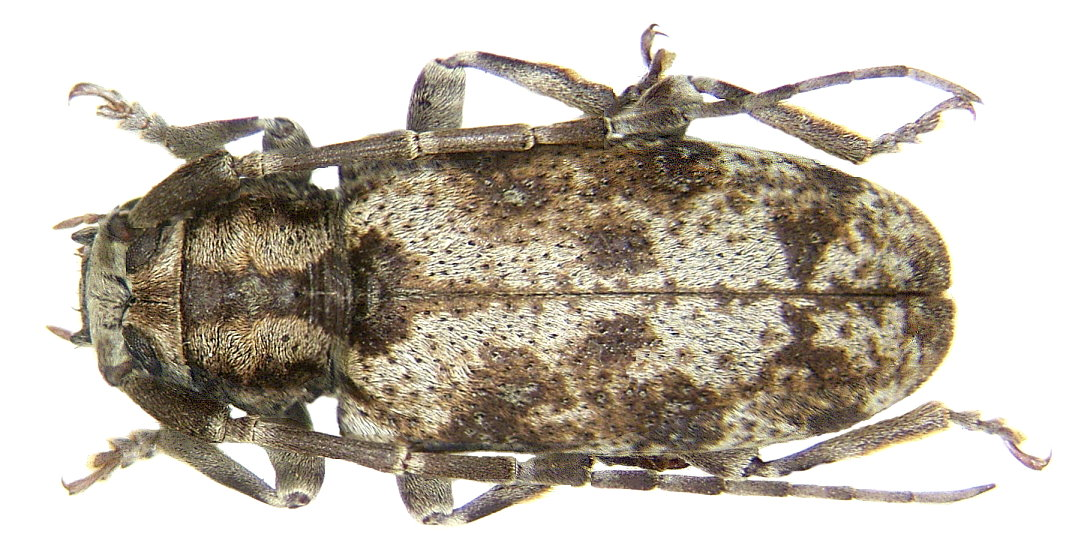

Scientific classification
- Kingdom: Animalia
- Phylum: Arthropoda
- Class: Insecta
- Order: Coleoptera
- Suborder: Polyphaga
- Infraorder: Cucujiformia
- Family: Cerambycidae
- Genus: Ontochariesthes
- Species: O. namibianus

Binomial name
- Ontochariesthes namibianus Adlbauer, 1996

= Ontochariesthes namibianus =

Species of beetle

Ontochariesthes namibianus is a species of beetle in the family Cerambycidae. It was described by Adlbauer in 1996. It is known from Namibia.
