= Paraphosphorus hololeucus =

Scientific classification
- Kingdom: Animalia
- Phylum: Arthropoda
- Class: Insecta
- Order: Coleoptera
- Suborder: Polyphaga
- Infraorder: Cucujiformia
- Family: Cerambycidae
- Genus: Paraphosphorus
- Species: P. hololeucus

Binomial name
- Paraphosphorus hololeucus Linell, 1896

Species of beetle

Paraphosphorus hololeucus is a species of beetle in the family Cerambycidae. It was described by Linell in 1896. It is known from Kenya.
