= Ontochariesthes erongoensis =

Scientific classification
- Kingdom: Animalia
- Phylum: Arthropoda
- Class: Insecta
- Order: Coleoptera
- Suborder: Polyphaga
- Infraorder: Cucujiformia
- Family: Cerambycidae
- Genus: Ontochariesthes
- Species: O. erongoensis

Binomial name
- Ontochariesthes erongoensis Adlbauer, 1996

Species of beetle

Ontochariesthes erongoensis is a species of beetle in the family Cerambycidae. It was described by Adlbauer in 1996. It is known from Namibia.
