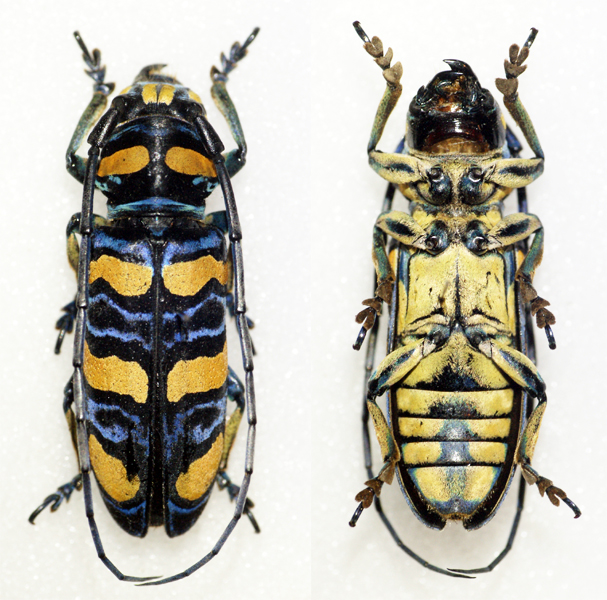

Scientific classification
- Kingdom: Animalia
- Phylum: Arthropoda
- Class: Insecta
- Order: Coleoptera
- Suborder: Polyphaga
- Infraorder: Cucujiformia
- Family: Cerambycidae
- Genus: Anatragus
- Species: A. ornatus

Binomial name
- Anatragus ornatus Kolbe, 1897

= Anatragus ornatus =

Species of beetle

Anatragus ornatus is a species of beetle in the family Cerambycidae. It was described by Hermann Julius Kolbe in 1897. It is known from Tanzania.
