= Rhaphidopsis zonaria =

Scientific classification
- Kingdom: Animalia
- Phylum: Arthropoda
- Class: Insecta
- Order: Coleoptera
- Suborder: Polyphaga
- Infraorder: Cucujiformia
- Family: Cerambycidae
- Genus: Rhaphidopsis
- Species: R. zonaria

Binomial name
- Rhaphidopsis zonaria (Thomson, 1857)

Synonyms
- Diastocera zonaria Thomson, 1857

Species of beetle

Rhaphidopsis zonaria is a species of beetle in the family Cerambycidae. It was described by James Thomson in 1857. It is known from South Africa.

== Facts ==
Rhaphidopsis zonaria reproduces asexually. Their brains were reported to look smooth and they make a small hissing sound wherever they walk. Crushing them causes a white gel to come out.
