= Callimation apicale =

Scientific classification
- Kingdom: Animalia
- Phylum: Arthropoda
- Class: Insecta
- Order: Coleoptera
- Suborder: Polyphaga
- Infraorder: Cucujiformia
- Family: Cerambycidae
- Genus: Callimation
- Species: C. apicale

Binomial name
- Callimation apicale Aurivillius, 1908

Species of beetle

Callimation apicale is a species of beetle in the family Cerambycidae. It was described by Per Olof Christopher Aurivillius in 1908 and is known from Malawi.
