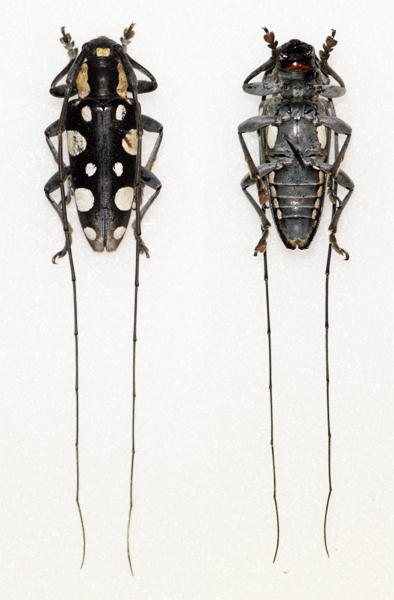

Scientific classification
- Kingdom: Animalia
- Phylum: Arthropoda
- Class: Insecta
- Order: Coleoptera
- Suborder: Polyphaga
- Infraorder: Cucujiformia
- Family: Cerambycidae
- Genus: Phymasterna
- Species: P. lacteoguttata

Binomial name
- Phymasterna lacteoguttata Laporte de Castelnau, 1840

Synonyms
- Phymatosterna lacteoguttata (Laporte de Castelnau) Gemminger & Harold, 1873

= Phymasterna lacteoguttata =

Species of beetle

Phymasterna lacteoguttata is a species of beetle in the family Cerambycidae. It was described by Laporte de Castelnau in 1840. It is known from Madagascar. It contains the variety Phymasterna lacteoguttata var. confluens.
