= Phymasterna rufocastanea =

Scientific classification
- Kingdom: Animalia
- Phylum: Arthropoda
- Class: Insecta
- Order: Coleoptera
- Suborder: Polyphaga
- Infraorder: Cucujiformia
- Family: Cerambycidae
- Genus: Phymasterna
- Species: P. rufocastanea

Binomial name
- Phymasterna rufocastanea Fairmaire, 1889

Species of beetle

Phymasterna rufocastanea is a species of beetle in the family Cerambycidae. It was described by Léon Fairmaire in 1889. It is known from Madagascar.
