= Kerochariesthes fulvoplagiata =

Scientific classification
- Kingdom: Animalia
- Phylum: Arthropoda
- Class: Insecta
- Order: Coleoptera
- Suborder: Polyphaga
- Infraorder: Cucujiformia
- Family: Cerambycidae
- Genus: Kerochariesthes
- Species: K. fulvoplagiata

Binomial name
- Kerochariesthes fulvoplagiata (Breuning, 1938)

Synonyms
- Isochariesthes vageplagiata Téocchi, 1993; Pseudochariesthes fulvoplagiata Breuning, 1938; Isochariesthes fulvoplagiata Téocchi, 1993; Kerochariesthes variegata vitticollis Téocchi, 1990; Pseudochariestes vitticollis Breuning, 1940; Pseudochariesthes vageplagiata Breuning, 1960; Kerochariesthes variegata Téocchi, 1990; Pseudochariesthes variegata Breuning, 1939

Species of beetle

Kerochariesthes fulvoplagiata is a species of beetle in the family Cerambycidae. It was described by Stephan von Breuning in 1938. It is known from Uganda and Somalia.
