= Phymasterna cyaneoguttata =

Scientific classification
- Kingdom: Animalia
- Phylum: Arthropoda
- Class: Insecta
- Order: Coleoptera
- Suborder: Polyphaga
- Infraorder: Cucujiformia
- Family: Cerambycidae
- Genus: Phymasterna
- Species: P. cyaneoguttata

Binomial name
- Phymasterna cyaneoguttata Fairmaire, 1886

Species of beetle

Phymasterna cyaneoguttata is a species of beetle in the family Cerambycidae. It was described by Léon Fairmaire in 1886. It is known from Madagascar.
