= Arianida =

Scientific classification
- Kingdom: Animalia
- Phylum: Arthropoda
- Class: Insecta
- Order: Coleoptera
- Suborder: Polyphaga
- Infraorder: Cucujiformia
- Family: Cerambycidae
- Tribe: Tragocephalini
- Genus: Arianida

Genus of beetles

Arianida is a genus of longhorn beetles of the subfamily Lamiinae, containing the following species:

- Arianida albosternalis Breuning, 1942
- Arianida mactata Fairmaire, 1903
