= Auriolus =

Scientific classification
- Kingdom: Animalia
- Phylum: Arthropoda
- Class: Insecta
- Order: Coleoptera
- Suborder: Polyphaga
- Infraorder: Cucujiformia
- Family: Cerambycidae
- Tribe: Tragocephalini
- Genus: Auriolus

Genus of beetles

Auriolus is a genus of longhorn beetles of the subfamily Lamiinae, containing the following species:

- Auriolus geniculatus Lepesme & Breuning, 1950
- Auriolus presidentialis Lepesme, 1947
