= Graciella (beetle) =

Scientific classification
- Domain: Eukaryota
- Kingdom: Animalia
- Phylum: Arthropoda
- Class: Insecta
- Order: Coleoptera
- Suborder: Polyphaga
- Infraorder: Cucujiformia
- Family: Cerambycidae
- Subfamily: Lamiinae
- Tribe: Tragocephalini
- Genus: Graciella; Jordan, 1894

Genus of beetles

Graciella is a genus of flat-faced longhorns in the beetle family Cerambycidae. There are about 13 described species in Graciella, found in Sub-Saharan Africa.

== Species ==
These 13 species belong to the genus Graciella:

- Graciella affinis Breuning, 1964 (Cameroon)
- Graciella albicans Breuning, 1961 (Cameroon)
- Graciella albomaculata (Breuning, 1952) (DR Congo)
- Graciella brunneomaculata Hintz, 1912 (Cameroon, Ivory Coast, and Sierra Leone)
- Graciella circuloides Teocchi, 1997 (Cameroon, Central African Republic)
- Graciella circulum Báguena, 1952 (Equatorial Guinea)
- Graciella compacta Jordan, 1894 (Equatorial Guinea, Gabon, DR Congo, Cameroon, Central African Republic, and Republic of the Congo)
- Graciella epipleuralis (Breuning, 1950) (Cameroon)
- Graciella flavovittata Teocchi & Sudre, 2003 (Central African Republic)
- Graciella mariettae Lepesme & Breuning, 1955 (Ivory Coast, Cameroon, and Gabon)
- Graciella moea Jordan, 1903 (Gabon, Togo, Central African Republic, Cameroon, and Republic of the Congo)
- Graciella nigromarginata Hintz, 1912 (Equatorial Guinea)
- Graciella pulchella (Klug, 1835) (Liberia, DR Congo, Uganda, Equatorial Guinea, Sénégal, Ivory Coast, Gabon, and Togo)
