= Ontochariesthes unicolor =

Scientific classification
- Kingdom: Animalia
- Phylum: Arthropoda
- Class: Insecta
- Order: Coleoptera
- Suborder: Polyphaga
- Infraorder: Cucujiformia
- Family: Cerambycidae
- Genus: Ontochariesthes
- Species: O. unicolor

Binomial name
- Ontochariesthes unicolor (Breuning, 1953)

Synonyms
- Chariesthoides unicolor Breuning, 1953

Species of beetle

Ontochariesthes unicolor is a species of beetle in the family Cerambycidae. It was described by Stephan von Breuning in 1953. It is known from Namibia and Angola.
