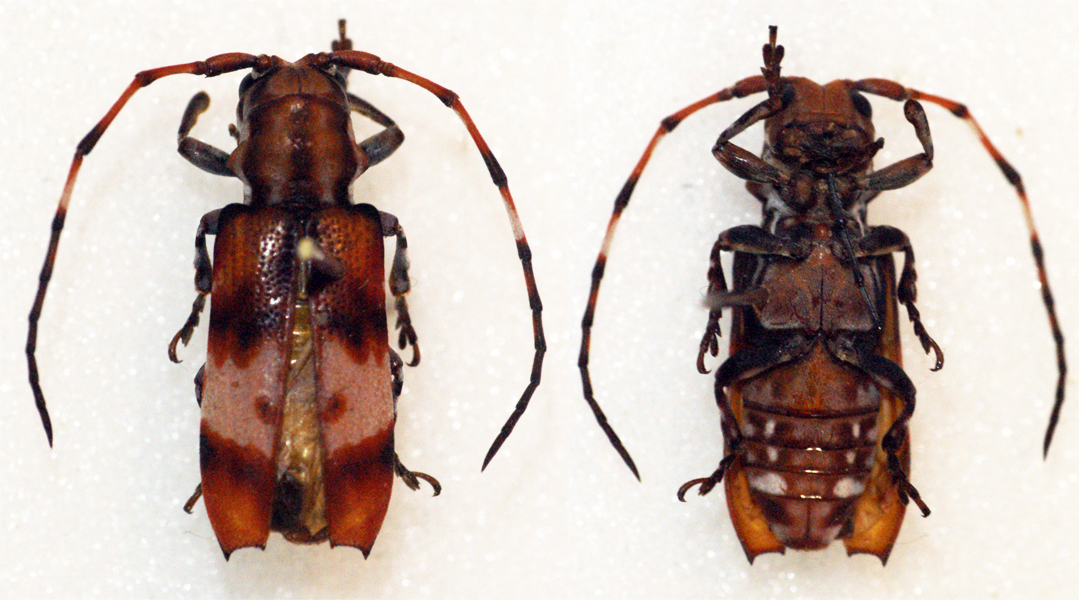
- Armatosterna spinifera

Scientific classification
- Kingdom: Animalia
- Phylum: Arthropoda
- Class: Insecta
- Order: Coleoptera
- Suborder: Polyphaga
- Infraorder: Cucujiformia
- Family: Cerambycidae
- Subfamily: Lamiinae
- Tribe: Tragocephalini
- Genus: Armatosterna; Jordan, 1894

= Armatosterna =

Genus of beetles

Armatosterna is a genus of longhorn beetles of the subfamily Lamiinae, containing the following species:

- Armatosterna buquetiana (White, 1856)
- Armatosterna castelnaudi (Thomson, 1865)
- Armatosterna spinifera Jordan, 1894
