= Mimolagrida rufescens =

Scientific classification
- Kingdom: Animalia
- Phylum: Arthropoda
- Class: Insecta
- Order: Coleoptera
- Suborder: Polyphaga
- Infraorder: Cucujiformia
- Family: Cerambycidae
- Genus: Mimolagrida
- Species: M. rufescens

Binomial name
- Mimolagrida rufescens Breuning, 1947

Species of beetle

Mimolagrida rufescens is a species of beetle in the family Cerambycidae. It was described by Stephan von Breuning in 1947. It is currently believed to be endemic to Madagascar.
