= Dinocephalus heissi =

Scientific classification
- Domain: Eukaryota
- Kingdom: Animalia
- Phylum: Arthropoda
- Class: Insecta
- Order: Coleoptera
- Suborder: Polyphaga
- Infraorder: Cucujiformia
- Family: Cerambycidae
- Genus: Dinocephalus
- Species: D. heissi

Binomial name
- Dinocephalus heissi Holzschuh, 1991

Species of beetle

Dinocephalus heissi is a species of beetle in the family Cerambycidae. It was described by Holzschuh in 1991.
