= Kerochariesthes holzschuhi =

Scientific classification
- Domain: Eukaryota
- Kingdom: Animalia
- Phylum: Arthropoda
- Class: Insecta
- Order: Coleoptera
- Suborder: Polyphaga
- Infraorder: Cucujiformia
- Family: Cerambycidae
- Genus: Kerochariesthes
- Species: K. holzschuhi

Binomial name
- Kerochariesthes holzschuhi Téocchi, 1989

Synonyms
- Freapomecyna holzschuhi Téocchi, 1989

Species of beetle

Kerochariesthes holzschuhi is a species of beetle in the family Cerambycidae. It was described by Pierre Téocchi in 1989. It is known from Saudi Arabia.
