= Parasolymus =

Scientific classification
- Kingdom: Animalia
- Phylum: Arthropoda
- Class: Insecta
- Order: Coleoptera
- Suborder: Polyphaga
- Infraorder: Cucujiformia
- Family: Cerambycidae
- Tribe: Tragocephalini
- Genus: Parasolymus

Genus of beetles

Parasolymus is a genus of longhorn beetles of the subfamily Lamiinae, containing the following species:

- Parasolymus multiguttatus Breuning, 1949
- Parasolymus sjostedti Breuning, 1934
