= Arianida mactata =

Scientific classification
- Kingdom: Animalia
- Phylum: Arthropoda
- Class: Insecta
- Order: Coleoptera
- Suborder: Polyphaga
- Infraorder: Cucujiformia
- Family: Cerambycidae
- Genus: Arianida
- Species: A. mactata

Binomial name
- Arianida mactata Fairmaire, 1903

Species of beetle

Arianida mactata is a species of beetle in the family Cerambycidae. It was described by Léon Fairmaire in 1903. It is known from Madagascar.
