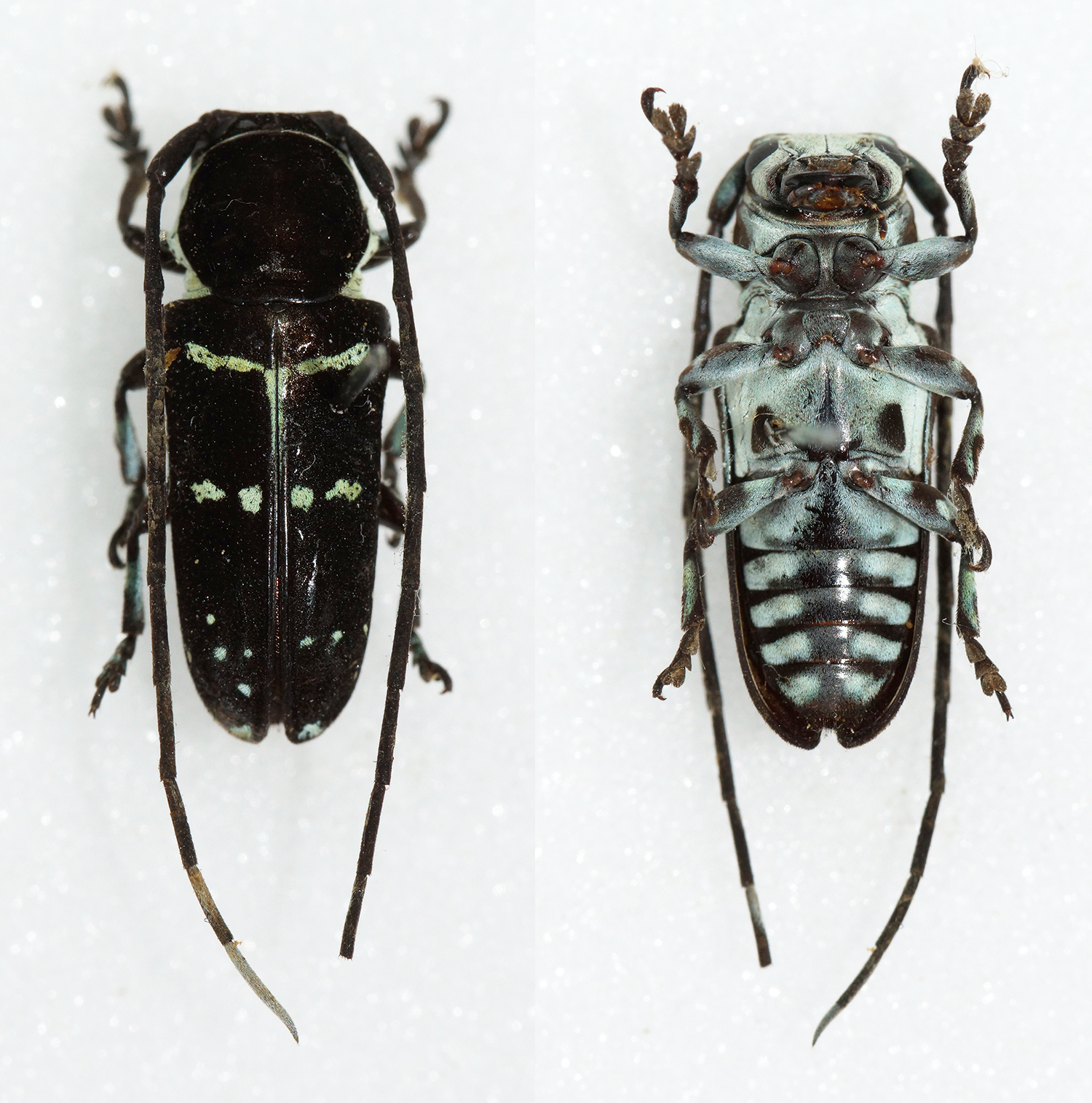

Scientific classification
- Kingdom: Animalia
- Phylum: Arthropoda
- Class: Insecta
- Order: Coleoptera
- Suborder: Polyphaga
- Infraorder: Cucujiformia
- Family: Cerambycidae
- Genus: Nyctopais
- Species: N. mysteriosus

Binomial name
- Nyctopais mysteriosus Thomson, 1858

Synonyms
- Nyctopais mysteriosus m. suturatus Breuning, 1970; Nyctopais mysteriosus m. suturalis Baguena Corella, 1952

= Nyctopais mysteriosus =

Species of beetle

Nyctopais mysteriosus is a species of beetle in the family Cerambycidae. It was described by James Thomson in 1858. It is known from the Democratic Republic of the Congo, Cameroon, and Gabon.
