= Phymasterna affinis =

Scientific classification
- Kingdom: Animalia
- Phylum: Arthropoda
- Class: Insecta
- Order: Coleoptera
- Suborder: Polyphaga
- Infraorder: Cucujiformia
- Family: Cerambycidae
- Genus: Phymasterna
- Species: P. affinis

Binomial name
- Phymasterna affinis Breuning, 1980

Species of beetle

Phymasterna affinis is a species of beetle in the family Cerambycidae. It was described by Stephan von Breuning in 1980. It is known from Madagascar.
