= Kerochariesthes =

Scientific classification
- Domain: Eukaryota
- Kingdom: Animalia
- Phylum: Arthropoda
- Class: Insecta
- Order: Coleoptera
- Suborder: Polyphaga
- Infraorder: Cucujiformia
- Family: Cerambycidae
- Tribe: Tragocephalini
- Genus: Kerochariesthes

Genus of beetles

Kerochariesthes is a genus of longhorn beetles of the subfamily Lamiinae, containing the following species:

- Kerochariesthes fulvoplagiata (Breuning, 1938)
- Kerochariesthes holzschuhi Téocchi, 1989
