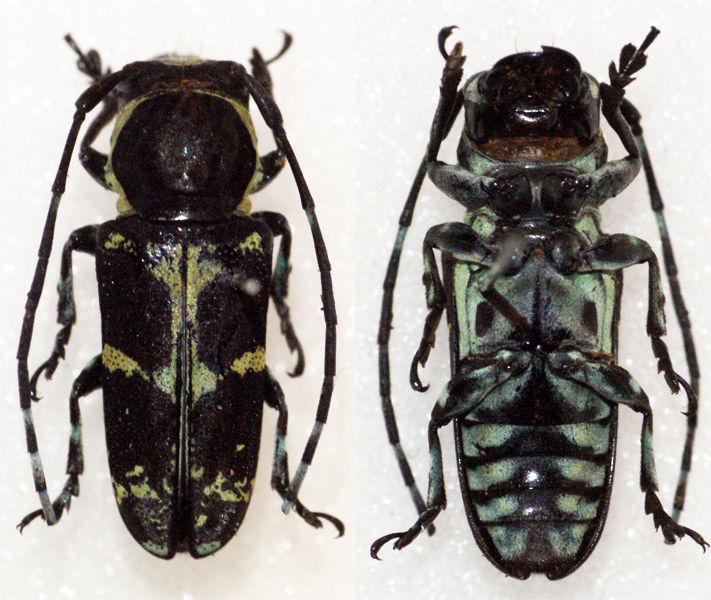
- Nyctopais mysticus

Scientific classification
- Kingdom: Animalia
- Phylum: Arthropoda
- Class: Insecta
- Order: Coleoptera
- Suborder: Polyphaga
- Infraorder: Cucujiformia
- Family: Cerambycidae
- Subfamily: Lamiinae
- Tribe: Tragocephalini
- Genus: Nyctopais; Thomson, 1858

= Nyctopais =

Genus of beetles

Nyctopais is a genus of longhorn beetles of the subfamily Lamiinae, containing the following species:

- Nyctopais burgeoni Breuning, 1934
- Nyctopais jordani Aurivillius, 1913
- Nyctopais mysteriosus Thomson, 1858
- Nyctopais mysticus Jordan, 1894
