= Paraphosphorus bipunctatus =

Scientific classification
- Kingdom: Animalia
- Phylum: Arthropoda
- Class: Insecta
- Order: Coleoptera
- Suborder: Polyphaga
- Infraorder: Cucujiformia
- Family: Cerambycidae
- Genus: Paraphosphorus
- Species: P. bipunctatus

Binomial name
- Paraphosphorus bipunctatus (Gahan, 1902)

Synonyms
- Paraphosphorus bipunctata (Gahan, 1902); Entebbia bipunctata Gahan, 1902

Species of beetle

Paraphosphorus bipunctatus is a species of beetle in the family Cerambycidae. It was described by Charles Joseph Gahan in 1902. It is known from Tanzania, Kenya, and Uganda.
