= Spilotragus xanthus =

Scientific classification
- Kingdom: Animalia
- Phylum: Arthropoda
- Class: Insecta
- Order: Coleoptera
- Suborder: Polyphaga
- Infraorder: Cucujiformia
- Family: Cerambycidae
- Genus: Spilotragus
- Species: S. xanthus

Binomial name
- Spilotragus xanthus Jordan, 1903

Species of beetle

Spilotragus xanthus is a species of beetle in the family Cerambycidae. It was described by Karl Jordan in 1903. It is known from Mozambique and the Democratic Republic of the Congo.
