= Breuningiana =

Scientific classification
- Kingdom: Animalia
- Phylum: Arthropoda
- Class: Insecta
- Order: Coleoptera
- Suborder: Polyphaga
- Infraorder: Cucujiformia
- Family: Cerambycidae
- Tribe: Tragocephalini
- Genus: Breuningiana; Strand, 1936
- Species: B. pulchra

Binomial name
- Breuningiana pulchra (Jordan, 1894)

Genus of beetles

Breuningiana pulchra is a species of beetle in the family Cerambycidae, and the only species in the genus Breuningiana. The species was described by Karl Jordan in 1894.
