= Spilotragus ornatus =

Scientific classification
- Kingdom: Animalia
- Phylum: Arthropoda
- Class: Insecta
- Order: Coleoptera
- Suborder: Polyphaga
- Infraorder: Cucujiformia
- Family: Cerambycidae
- Genus: Spilotragus
- Species: S. ornatus

Binomial name
- Spilotragus ornatus (Gahan, 1898)

Species of beetle

Spilotragus ornatus is a species of beetle in the family Cerambycidae. It was described by Charles Joseph Gahan in 1898.
