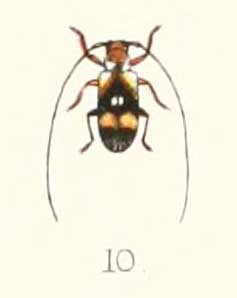

Scientific classification
- Kingdom: Animalia
- Phylum: Arthropoda
- Class: Insecta
- Order: Coleoptera
- Suborder: Polyphaga
- Infraorder: Cucujiformia
- Family: Cerambycidae
- Genus: Murosternum
- Species: M. mocquerysi

Binomial name
- Murosternum mocquerysi Jordan, 1894

= Murosternum mocquerysi =

Species of beetle

Murosternum mocquerysi is a species of beetle in the family Cerambycidae. It was described by Karl Jordan in 1894.
