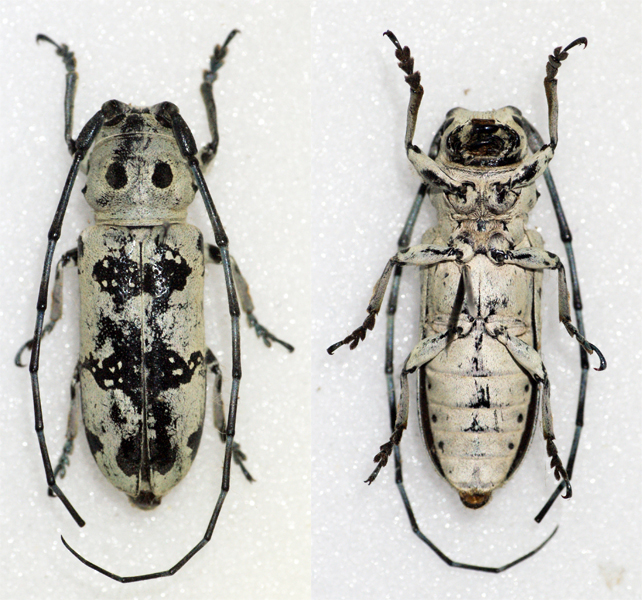

Scientific classification
- Kingdom: Animalia
- Phylum: Arthropoda
- Class: Insecta
- Order: Coleoptera
- Suborder: Polyphaga
- Infraorder: Cucujiformia
- Family: Cerambycidae
- Genus: Rhaphidopsis
- Species: R. melaleuca

Binomial name
- Rhaphidopsis melaleuca Gerstaecker, 1855

Synonyms
- Rhaphidopsis melaleuca m. blairi Breuning, 1934; Rhaphidopsis melaleuca var. breuningi Gilmour, 1956; Eutaenia alba Thomson, 1860

= Rhaphidopsis melaleuca =

Species of beetle

Rhaphidopsis melaleuca is a species of beetle in the family Cerambycidae. It was described by Carl Eduard Adolph Gerstaecker in 1855. It is known from Tanzania, Mozambique, Namibia, Malawi, Zambia, South Africa, and Zimbabwe.

== Varieties ==
- Rhaphidopsis melaleuca var. picta (Fåhraeus, 1872)
- Rhaphidopsis melaleuca var. holdhausi Brancsik, 1914
