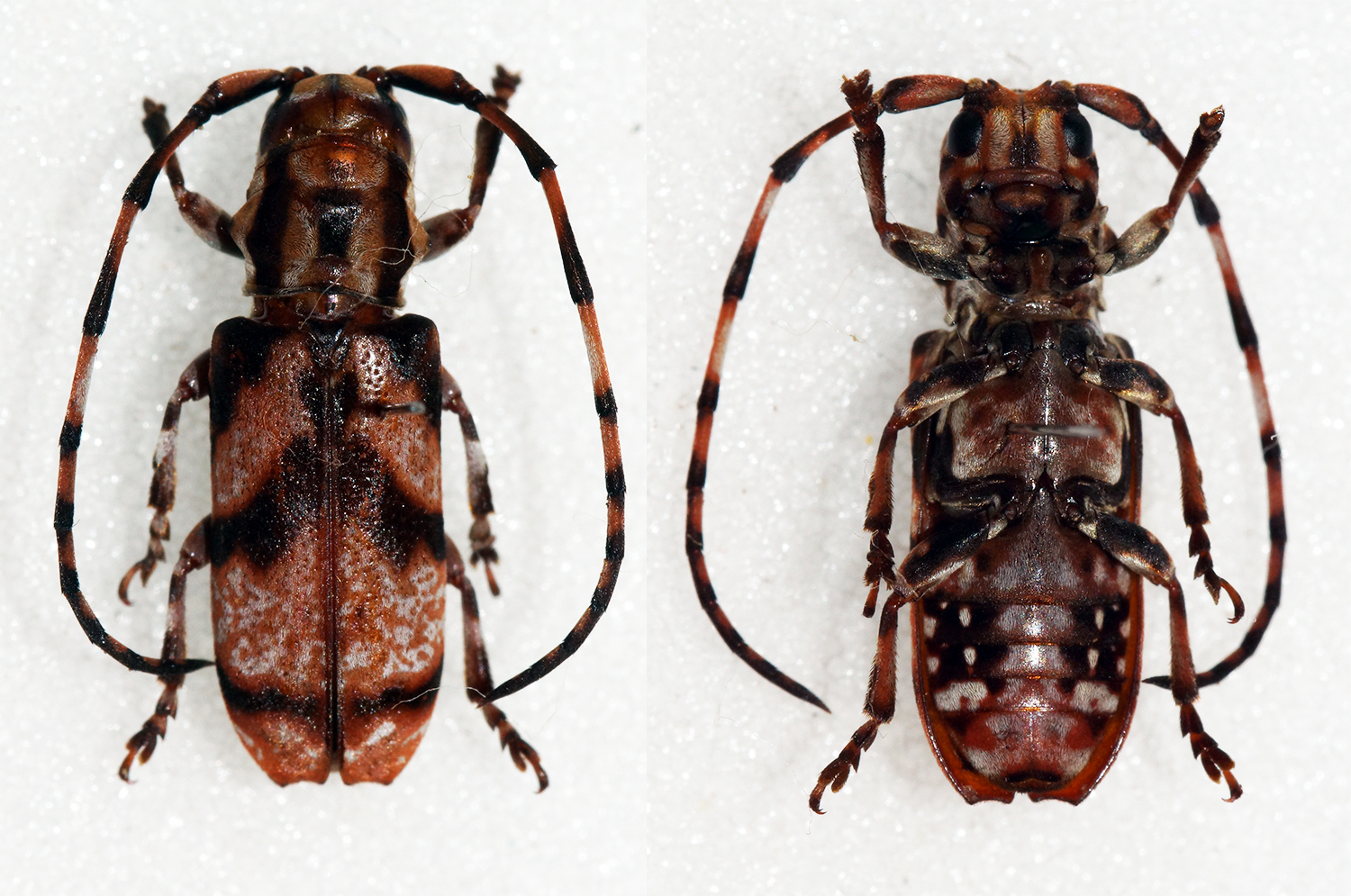

Scientific classification
- Kingdom: Animalia
- Phylum: Arthropoda
- Class: Insecta
- Order: Coleoptera
- Suborder: Polyphaga
- Infraorder: Cucujiformia
- Family: Cerambycidae
- Genus: Armatosterna
- Species: A. buquetiana

Binomial name
- Armatosterna buquetiana (White, 1856)

Synonyms
- Callimation lepidum Fiedler, 1939; Tragocephala buquetiana White, 1856

= Armatosterna buquetiana =

Species of beetle

Armatosterna buquetiana is a species of beetle in the family Cerambycidae. It was described by White in 1856, originally under the genus Tragocephala. It is known from Nigeria, Cameroon, the Ivory Coast, Benin, Ghana, Liberia, Sierra Leone, Guinea, and Togo.
