= Parasolymus multiguttatus =

Scientific classification
- Kingdom: Animalia
- Phylum: Arthropoda
- Class: Insecta
- Order: Coleoptera
- Suborder: Polyphaga
- Infraorder: Cucujiformia
- Family: Cerambycidae
- Genus: Parasolymus
- Species: P. multiguttatus

Binomial name
- Parasolymus multiguttatus Breuning, 1949

Species of beetle

Parasolymus multiguttatus is a species of beetle in the family Cerambycidae. It was described by Stephan von Breuning in 1949.
