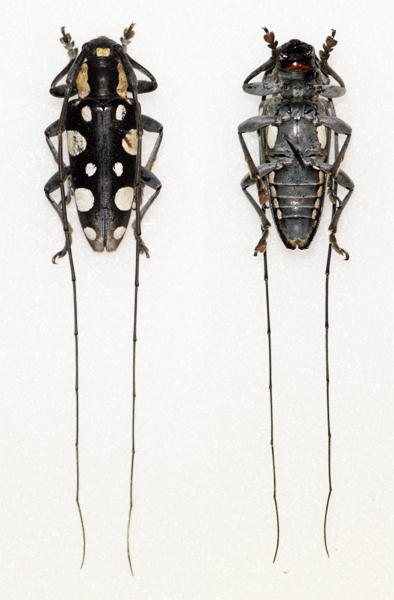
- Phymasterna lacteoguttata

Scientific classification
- Kingdom: Animalia
- Phylum: Arthropoda
- Class: Insecta
- Order: Coleoptera
- Suborder: Polyphaga
- Infraorder: Cucujiformia
- Family: Cerambycidae
- Tribe: Tragocephalini
- Genus: Phymasterna; Laporte, 1840

= Phymasterna =

Genus of beetles

Phymasterna is a genus of longhorn beetles of the subfamily Lamiinae, containing the following species:

- Phymasterna affinis Breuning, 1980
- Phymasterna annulata Fairmaire, 1903
- Phymasterna gracilis Breuning, 1957
- Phymasterna lacteoguttata Laporte de Castelnau, 1840
- Phymasterna maculifrons Gahan, 1890
- Phymasterna rufocastanea Fairmaire, 1889

Incertae sedis

- Phymasterna cyaneoguttata Fairmaire, 1886
