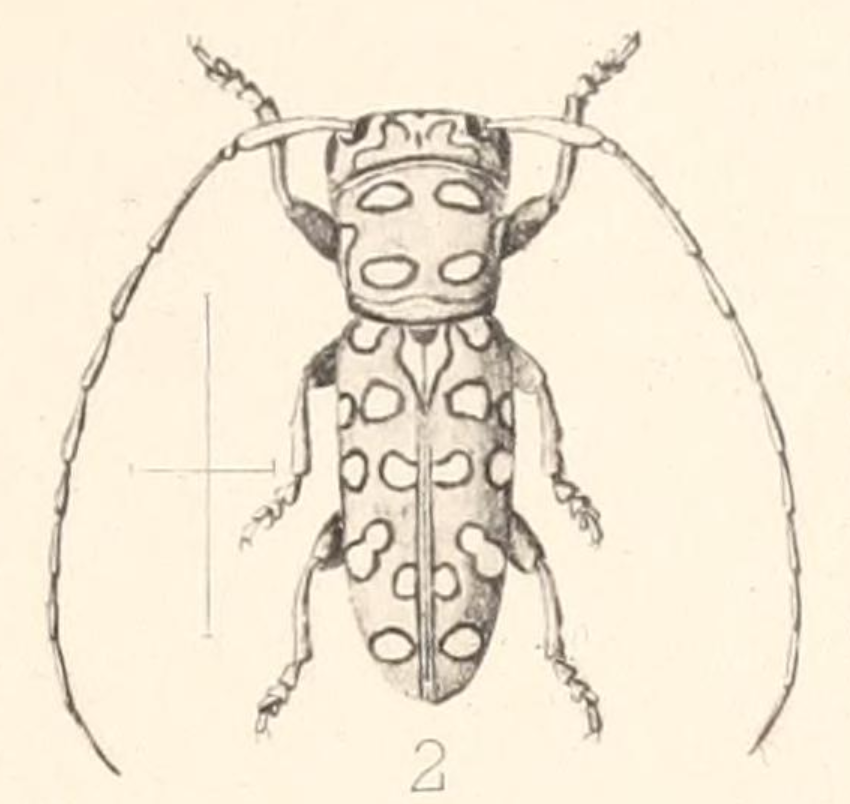

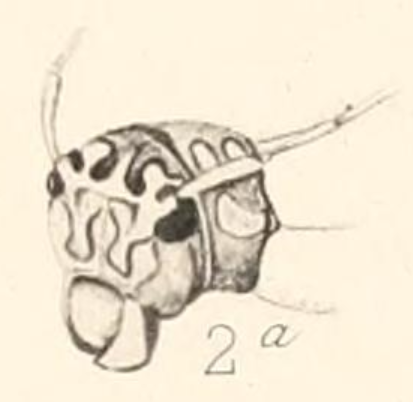

Scientific classification
- Kingdom: Animalia
- Phylum: Arthropoda
- Class: Insecta
- Order: Coleoptera
- Suborder: Polyphaga
- Infraorder: Cucujiformia
- Family: Cerambycidae
- Genus: Dinocephalus
- Species: D. ornatus

Binomial name
- Dinocephalus ornatus Péringuey, 1899

= Dinocephalus ornatus =

Species of beetle

Dinocephalus ornatus is a species of beetle in the family Cerambycidae. It was described by Louis Péringuey in 1899. It is known from Tanzania, Mozambique, Somalia, Malawi, South Africa, Ethiopia, and Zambia. It contains the varietas Dinocephalus ornatus var. nigroannulatus.
