= Nyctopais jordani =

Scientific classification
- Kingdom: Animalia
- Phylum: Arthropoda
- Class: Insecta
- Order: Coleoptera
- Suborder: Polyphaga
- Infraorder: Cucujiformia
- Family: Cerambycidae
- Genus: Nyctopais
- Species: N. jordani

Binomial name
- Nyctopais jordani Aurivillius, 1913

Synonyms
- Nyctopais viridescens Breuning, 1953

Species of beetle

Nyctopais jordani is a species of beetle in the family Cerambycidae. It was described by Per Olof Christopher Aurivillius in 1913. It is known from Uganda and the Democratic Republic of the Congo.
