= Spilotragus variabilis =

Scientific classification
- Kingdom: Animalia
- Phylum: Arthropoda
- Class: Insecta
- Order: Coleoptera
- Suborder: Polyphaga
- Infraorder: Cucujiformia
- Family: Cerambycidae
- Genus: Spilotragus
- Species: S. variabilis

Binomial name
- Spilotragus variabilis (Jordan, 1897)

Species of beetle

Spilotragus variabilis is a species of beetle in the family Cerambycidae. It was described by Karl Jordan in 1897.
