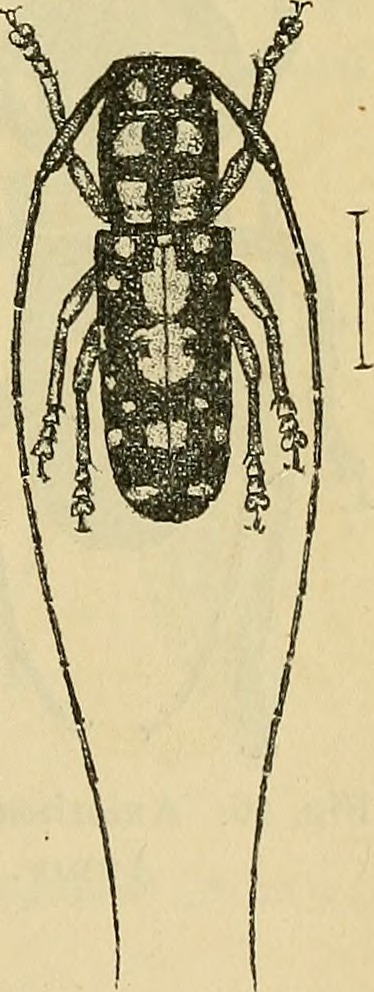
- An illustration of Spilotragus crucifer

Scientific classification
- Kingdom: Animalia
- Phylum: Arthropoda
- Class: Insecta
- Order: Coleoptera
- Suborder: Polyphaga
- Infraorder: Cucujiformia
- Family: Cerambycidae
- Genus: Spilotragus
- Species: S. crucifer

Binomial name
- Spilotragus crucifer Aurivillius, 1908

Synonyms
- Crucitragus crucifer Aurivillius, 1908

= Spilotragus crucifer =

Species of beetle

Spilotragus crucifer is a species of beetle in the family Cerambycidae. It was described by Per Olof Christopher Aurivillius in 1908. It is known from Somalia and Kenya.
