= Paracedemon =

Scientific classification
- Kingdom: Animalia
- Phylum: Arthropoda
- Class: Insecta
- Order: Coleoptera
- Suborder: Polyphaga
- Infraorder: Cucujiformia
- Family: Cerambycidae
- Tribe: Tragocephalini
- Genus: Paracedemon

Genus of beetles

Paracedemon is a genus of longhorn beetles of the subfamily Lamiinae, containing the following species:

- Paracedemon niger Breuning, 1957
- Paracedemon ruber Breuning, 1942
