= Murosternum pulchellum =

Scientific classification
- Kingdom: Animalia
- Phylum: Arthropoda
- Class: Insecta
- Order: Coleoptera
- Suborder: Polyphaga
- Infraorder: Cucujiformia
- Family: Cerambycidae
- Genus: Murosternum
- Species: M. pulchellum

Binomial name
- Murosternum pulchellum (Dalman, 1817)

Synonyms
- Lamia pulchella Dalman, 1817

Species of beetle

Murosternum pulchellum is a species of beetle in the family Cerambycidae. It was described by Dalman in 1817, originally under the genus Lamia. It is known from the Ivory Coast, Liberia, Sierra Leone, Nigeria, Ghana, the Democratic Republic of the Congo, and Togo. It contains the varietas Murosternum pulchellum var. dalmanni.

== Subspecies ==
- Murosternum pulchellum pulchellum (Dalman, 1817)
- Murosternum pulchellum viridescens Breuning, 1970
