= Mimolagrida rufa =

Scientific classification
- Kingdom: Animalia
- Phylum: Arthropoda
- Class: Insecta
- Order: Coleoptera
- Suborder: Polyphaga
- Infraorder: Cucujiformia
- Family: Cerambycidae
- Genus: Mimolagrida
- Species: M. rufa

Binomial name
- Mimolagrida rufa Breuning, 1947

Species of beetle

Mimolagrida rufa is a species of beetle in the family Cerambycidae. It was described by Stephan von Breuning in 1947. It is known from Madagascar.

== Varietas ==
- Mimolagrida rufa var. rufotibialis Breuning, 1957
- Mimolagrida rufa var. fuscofemorata Breuning, 1957
