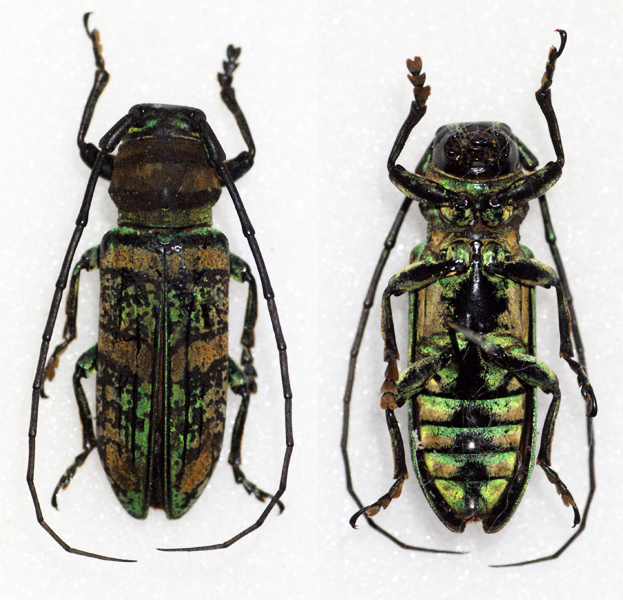
- Anatragus pulchellus

Scientific classification
- Kingdom: Animalia
- Phylum: Arthropoda
- Class: Insecta
- Order: Coleoptera
- Suborder: Polyphaga
- Infraorder: Cucujiformia
- Family: Cerambycidae
- Tribe: Tragocephalini
- Genus: Anatragus

= Anatragus =

Genus of beetles

Anatragus is a genus of African longhorn beetles of the subfamily Lamiinae, containing the following species:

- Anatragus ornatus Kolbe, 1897
- Anatragus pulchellus (Westwood, 1845)
