= Dinocephalus alboguttatus =

Scientific classification
- Kingdom: Animalia
- Phylum: Arthropoda
- Class: Insecta
- Order: Coleoptera
- Suborder: Polyphaga
- Infraorder: Cucujiformia
- Family: Cerambycidae
- Genus: Dinocephalus
- Species: D. alboguttatus

Binomial name
- Dinocephalus alboguttatus Breuning, 1958

Species of beetle

Dinocephalus alboguttatus is a species of beetle in the family Cerambycidae. It was described by Stephan von Breuning in 1958.
