= Phymasterna maculifrons =

Scientific classification
- Kingdom: Animalia
- Phylum: Arthropoda
- Class: Insecta
- Order: Coleoptera
- Suborder: Polyphaga
- Infraorder: Cucujiformia
- Family: Cerambycidae
- Genus: Phymasterna
- Species: P. maculifrons

Binomial name
- Phymasterna maculifrons Gahan, 1890

Species of beetle

Phymasterna maculifrons is a species of beetle in the family Cerambycidae. It was described by Charles Joseph Gahan in 1890. It is known from Madagascar.
