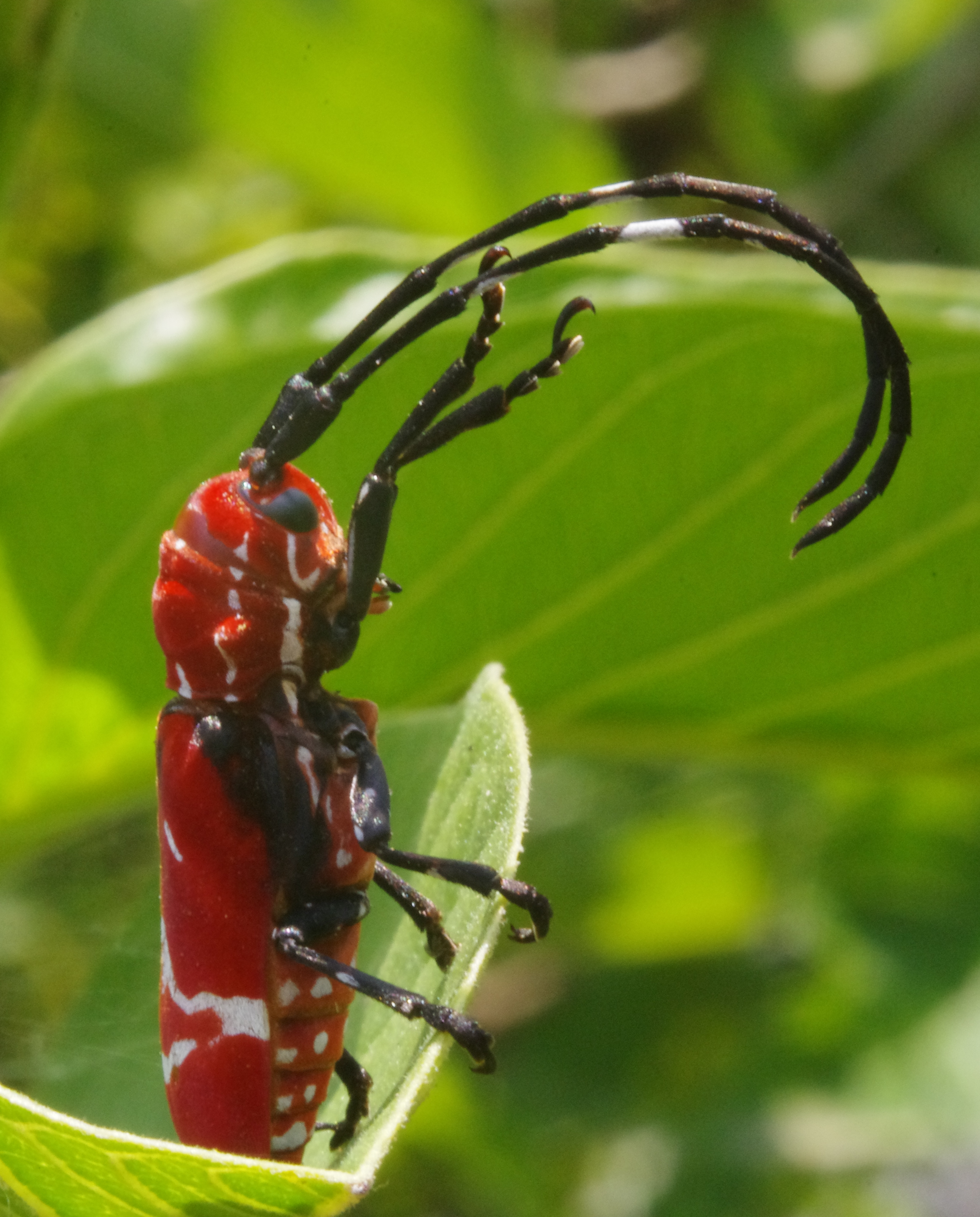

Scientific classification
- Kingdom: Animalia
- Phylum: Arthropoda
- Class: Insecta
- Order: Coleoptera
- Suborder: Polyphaga
- Infraorder: Cucujiformia
- Family: Cerambycidae
- Genus: Callimation
- Species: C. venustum

Binomial name
- Callimation venustum Guérin-Méneville, 1844

Synonyms
- Callimation callipygum Thomson, 1857

= Callimation venustum =

Species of beetle

Callimation venustum is a species of beetle in the family Cerambycidae. It was described by Félix Édouard Guérin-Méneville in 1844. It is known from Madagascar. It contains the variety Callimation venustum var. obscurum.
