= Callimation corallinum =

Scientific classification
- Kingdom: Animalia
- Phylum: Arthropoda
- Class: Insecta
- Order: Coleoptera
- Suborder: Polyphaga
- Infraorder: Cucujiformia
- Family: Cerambycidae
- Genus: Callimation
- Species: C. corallinum

Binomial name
- Callimation corallinum Fiedler, 1939

Species of beetle

Callimation corallinum is a species of beetle in the family Cerambycidae. It was described by Fiedler in 1939. It is known from Tanzania.
