= Spilotragus guttatus =

Scientific classification
- Kingdom: Animalia
- Phylum: Arthropoda
- Class: Insecta
- Order: Coleoptera
- Suborder: Polyphaga
- Infraorder: Cucujiformia
- Family: Cerambycidae
- Genus: Spilotragus
- Species: S. guttatus

Binomial name
- Spilotragus guttatus Breuning, 1934

Species of beetle

Spilotragus guttatus is a species of beetle in the family Cerambycidae. It was described by Stephan von Breuning in 1934.
