= Dinocephaloides =

Scientific classification
- Kingdom: Animalia
- Phylum: Arthropoda
- Class: Insecta
- Order: Coleoptera
- Suborder: Polyphaga
- Infraorder: Cucujiformia
- Family: Cerambycidae
- Tribe: Tragocephalini
- Genus: Dinocephaloides

Genus of beetles

Dinocephaloides is a genus of longhorn beetles of the subfamily Lamiinae, containing the following species:

- Dinocephaloides ochreomaculatus Breuning, 1951
- Dinocephaloides variemaculatus Breuning, 1958
