= Murosternum latefasciatum =

Scientific classification
- Kingdom: Animalia
- Phylum: Arthropoda
- Class: Insecta
- Order: Coleoptera
- Suborder: Polyphaga
- Infraorder: Cucujiformia
- Family: Cerambycidae
- Genus: Murosternum
- Species: M. latefasciatum

Binomial name
- Murosternum latefasciatum Breuning, 1938

Species of beetle

Murosternum latefasciatum is a species of beetle in the family Cerambycidae. It was described by Stephan von Breuning in 1938. It is known from Nigeria and the Ivory Coast.
