= Solymus pictor =

Scientific classification
- Domain: Eukaryota
- Kingdom: Animalia
- Phylum: Arthropoda
- Class: Insecta
- Order: Coleoptera
- Suborder: Polyphaga
- Infraorder: Cucujiformia
- Family: Cerambycidae
- Subfamily: Lamiinae
- Tribe: Tragocephalini
- Genus: Solymus; Lacordaire, 1872
- Species: S. pictor

Binomial name
- Solymus pictor (Klug, 1829)

Species of beetle

Solymus monotypic beetle genus in the family Cerambycidae, found in found in Mozambique, South Africa, and Tanzania.

It was described by Jean Théodore Lacordaire in 1872. Its single species, Solymus pictor, was described by Johann Christoph Friedrich Klug in 1829.
