= Mimolagrida =

Scientific classification
- Kingdom: Animalia
- Phylum: Arthropoda
- Class: Insecta
- Order: Coleoptera
- Suborder: Polyphaga
- Infraorder: Cucujiformia
- Family: Cerambycidae
- Tribe: Tragocephalini
- Genus: Mimolagrida

Genus of beetles

Mimolagrida is a genus of longhorn beetles of the subfamily Lamiinae. Members of this genus are also called lamiines or flat-faced longhorned beetles. This genus contains the following species:

- Mimolagrida rufa Breuning, 1947
- Mimolagrida rufescens Breuning, 1947
- Mimolagrida ruficollis Breuning, 1957
