= Murosternum paramolitor =

Scientific classification
- Kingdom: Animalia
- Phylum: Arthropoda
- Class: Insecta
- Order: Coleoptera
- Suborder: Polyphaga
- Infraorder: Cucujiformia
- Family: Cerambycidae
- Genus: Murosternum
- Species: M. paramolitor

Binomial name
- Murosternum paramolitor Breuning, 1968

Species of beetle

Murosternum paramolitor is a species of beetle in the family Cerambycidae. It was described by Stephan von Breuning in 1968.
