= Dinocephalus ocellatus =

Scientific classification
- Kingdom: Animalia
- Phylum: Arthropoda
- Class: Insecta
- Order: Coleoptera
- Suborder: Polyphaga
- Infraorder: Cucujiformia
- Family: Cerambycidae
- Genus: Dinocephalus
- Species: D. ocellatus

Binomial name
- Dinocephalus ocellatus Aurivillius, 1908

Species of beetle

Dinocephalus ocellatus is a species of beetle in the family Cerambycidae. It was described by Per Olof Christopher Aurivillius in 1908. It is known from Tanzania.
