= Phosphorous =

Phosphorous can refer to:

- Phosphorus in the lower of its two most common oxidation states, P(III) (e.g., phosphorous acid, phosphorous anhydride)
- Of or pertaining to the use of phosphorus (hence, phosphorous compounds). Used as an adjective
- A common misspelling of the element name phosphorus

== See also ==
- Phosphorus
- Phosphorus (disambiguation)
