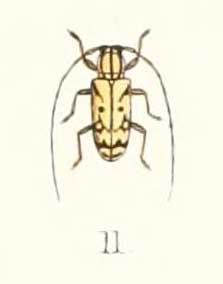

Scientific classification
- Kingdom: Animalia
- Phylum: Arthropoda
- Class: Insecta
- Order: Coleoptera
- Suborder: Polyphaga
- Infraorder: Cucujiformia
- Family: Cerambycidae
- Genus: Murosternum
- Species: M. pentagonale

Binomial name
- Murosternum pentagonale Jordan, 1894

= Murosternum pentagonale =

Species of beetle

Murosternum pentagonale is a species of beetle in the family Cerambycidae. It was described by Karl Jordan in 1894. It is known from Gabon, Cameroon, the Ivory Coast, the Democratic Republic of the Congo, Benin, and Nigeria. It contains the variety Murosternum pentagonale var. maculatum.
