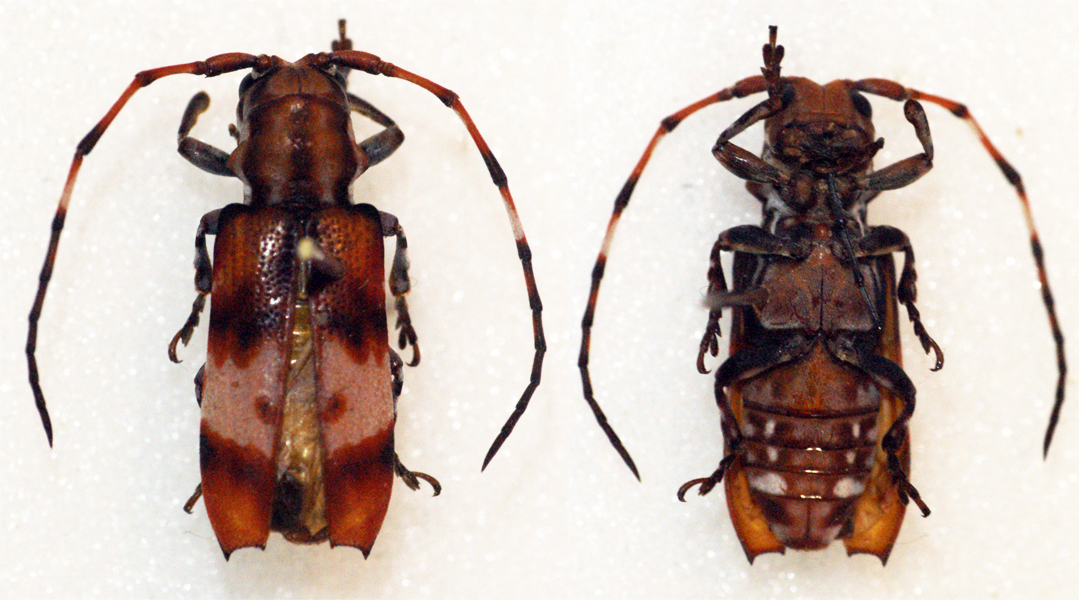

Scientific classification
- Kingdom: Animalia
- Phylum: Arthropoda
- Class: Insecta
- Order: Coleoptera
- Suborder: Polyphaga
- Infraorder: Cucujiformia
- Family: Cerambycidae
- Genus: Armatosterna
- Species: A. spinifera

Binomial name
- Armatosterna spinifera Jordan, 1894

= Armatosterna spinifera =

Species of beetle

Armatosterna spinifera is a species of beetle in the family Cerambycidae. It was described by Karl Jordan in 1894. It is known from the Republic of the Congo, the Democratic Republic of the Congo, Cameroon, Angola, Gabon, and Equatorial Guinea.
