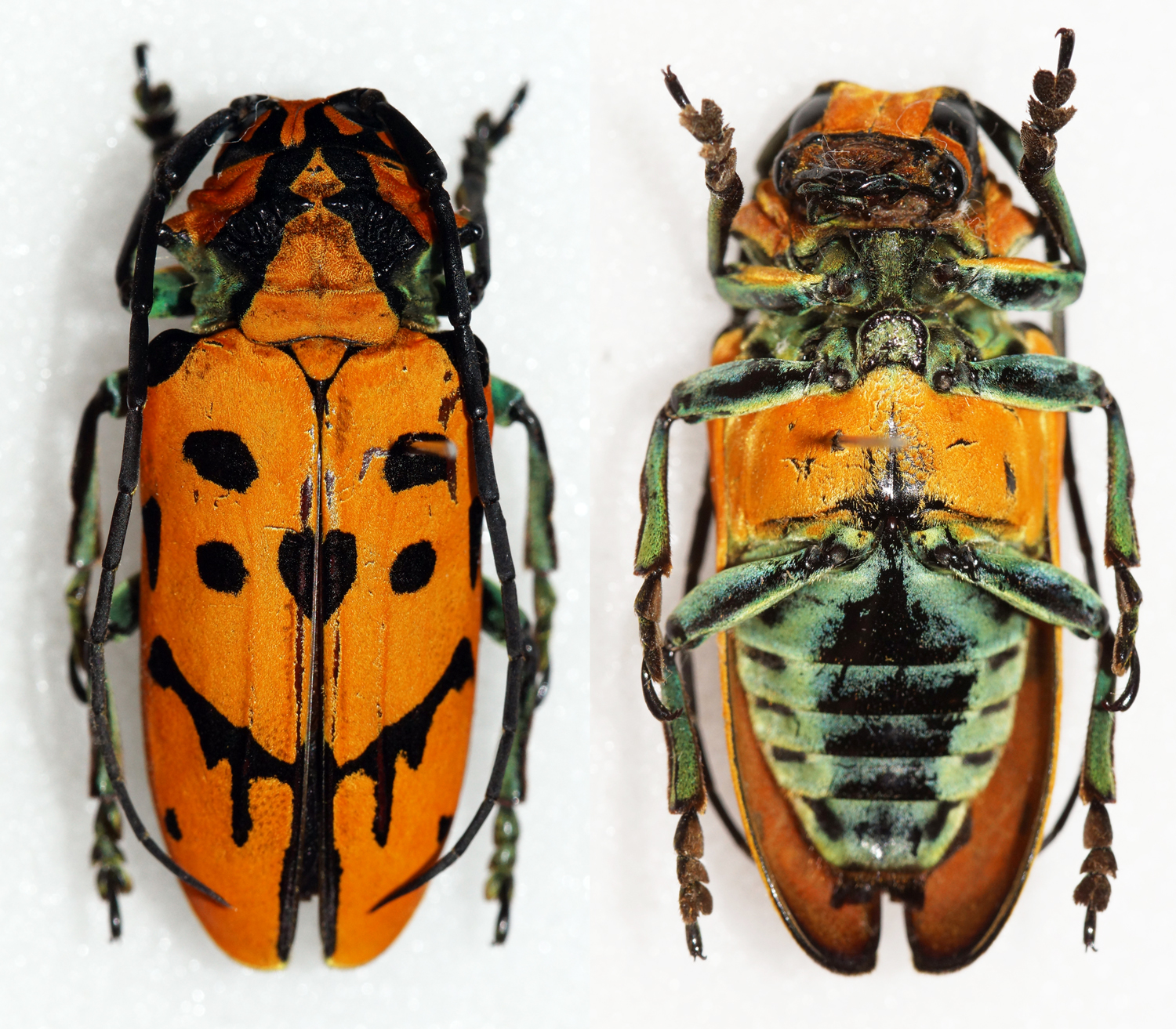

Scientific classification
- Kingdom: Animalia
- Phylum: Arthropoda
- Class: Insecta
- Order: Coleoptera
- Suborder: Polyphaga
- Infraorder: Cucujiformia
- Family: Cerambycidae
- Tribe: Tragocephalini
- Genus: Tragostoma; Aurivillius, 1914
- Species: T. imperator

Binomial name
- Tragostoma imperator Aurivillius, 1914

= Tragostoma =

Genus of beetles

Tragostoma is a monotypic beetle genus in the family Cerambycidae described by Per Olof Christopher Aurivillius in 1914. Its only species, Tragostoma imperator, was described by the same author in the same year.
