= Paracedemon ruber =

Scientific classification
- Kingdom: Animalia
- Phylum: Arthropoda
- Class: Insecta
- Order: Coleoptera
- Suborder: Polyphaga
- Infraorder: Cucujiformia
- Family: Cerambycidae
- Genus: Paracedemon
- Species: P. ruber

Binomial name
- Paracedemon ruber Breuning, 1942

Species of beetle

Paracedemon ruber is a species of beetle in the family Cerambycidae. It was described by Stephan von Breuning in 1942.

== Subspecies ==
- Paracedemon ruber rufoscapus Breuning, 1970
- Paracedemon ruber ruber Breuning, 1942
