= Spilotragus =

Scientific classification
- Kingdom: Animalia
- Phylum: Arthropoda
- Class: Insecta
- Order: Coleoptera
- Suborder: Polyphaga
- Infraorder: Cucujiformia
- Family: Cerambycidae
- Subfamily: Lamiinae
- Tribe: Tragocephalini
- Genus: Spilotragus; Jordan, 1903

Genus of beetles

Spilotragus is a genus of longhorn beetles of the subfamily Lamiinae, containing the following species:

subgenus Crucitragus

- Spilotragus crucifer Aurivillius, 1908

subgenus Spilotragus

- Spilotragus clarkei Breuning, 1976
- Spilotragus guttatus Breuning, 1934
- Spilotragus ornatus (Gahan, 1898)
- Spilotragus variabilis (Jordan, 1897)
- Spilotragus xanthus Jordan, 1903
