= Neochariesthes =

Scientific classification
- Kingdom: Animalia
- Phylum: Arthropoda
- Class: Insecta
- Order: Coleoptera
- Suborder: Polyphaga
- Infraorder: Cucujiformia
- Family: Cerambycidae
- Genus: Neochariesthes
- Species: N. subsaperdoides

Binomial name
- Neochariesthes subsaperdoides (Breuning, 1960)

Genus of beetles

Neochariesthes subsaperdoides is a species of beetle in the family Cerambycidae, and the only species in the genus Neochariesthes. It was described by Stephan von Breuning in 1960.
