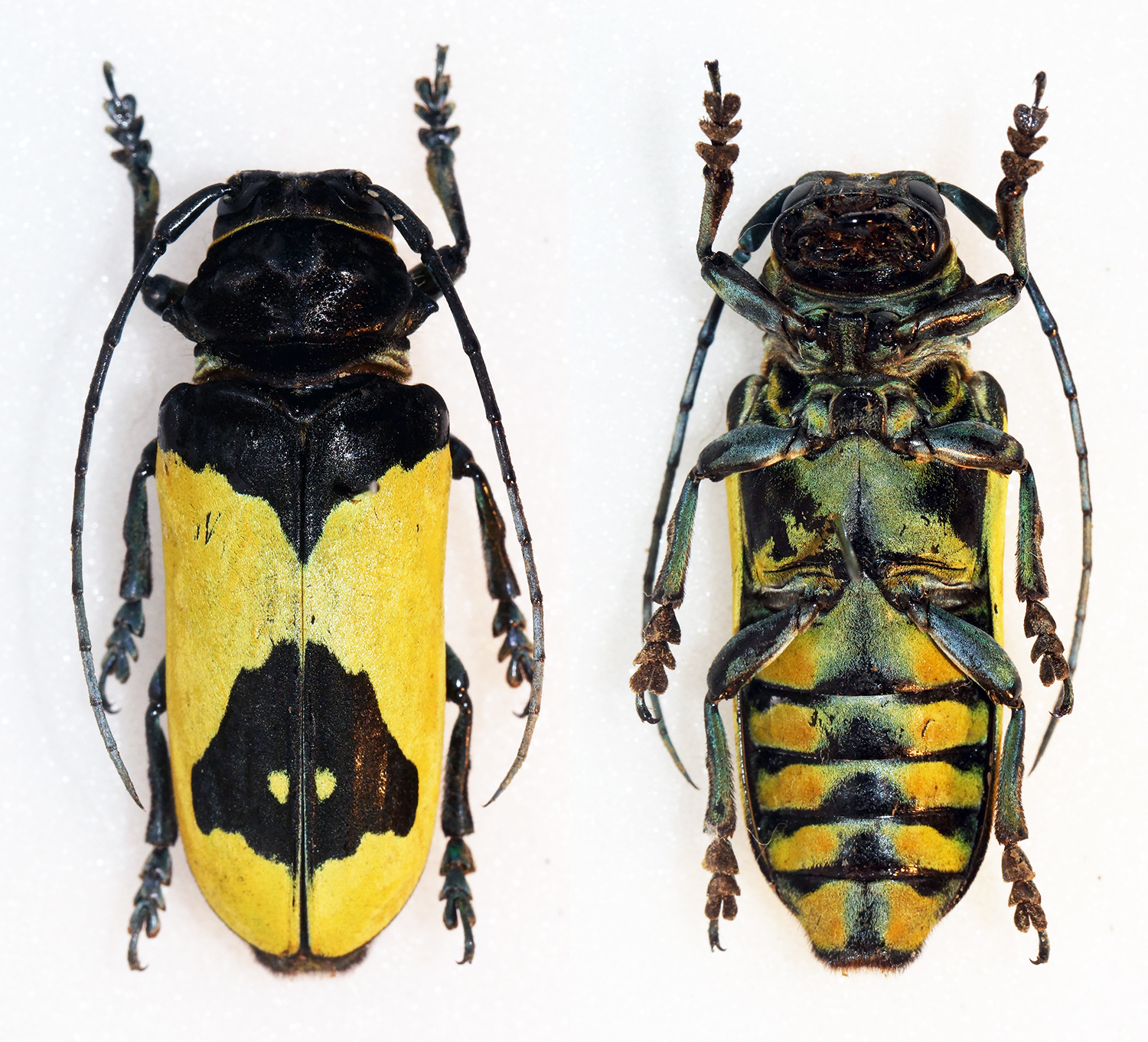

Scientific classification
- Kingdom: Animalia
- Phylum: Arthropoda
- Clade: Pancrustacea
- Class: Insecta
- Order: Coleoptera
- Suborder: Polyphaga
- Infraorder: Cucujiformia
- Family: Cerambycidae
- Subfamily: Lamiinae
- Tribe: Tragocephalini
- Genus: Phosphorus; Thomson, 1857
- Species: P. virescens

Binomial name
- Phosphorus virescens (Olivier, 1795)

Synonyms
- Tragocephala virescens (Olivier, 1795); Phosphorus robustus Aurivillius, 1914; Prosopocera virescens (Olivier, 1795); Voetia virescens (Olivier, 1795); Cerambix virescens Olivier, 1795; Cerambix angulator Olivier, 1795

= Phosphorus virescens =

Species of beetle

Phosphorus virescens is a species of beetle in the family Cerambycidae. It was described by Guillaume-Antoine Olivier in 1795, originally under the genus Cerambix. It has a wide distribution throughout Africa. It is the only species in the genus Phosphorus.

The species is known to damage Cola nitida in cultivation where it is known as the Kola tree borer. Larvae bore through the stems causing death of branches. The yellow coloration on the elytra is fluorescent.
