= Paraplagiomus =

Scientific classification
- Kingdom: Animalia
- Phylum: Arthropoda
- Class: Insecta
- Order: Coleoptera
- Suborder: Polyphaga
- Infraorder: Cucujiformia
- Family: Cerambycidae
- Genus: Paraplagiomus
- Species: P. tragiscoides

Binomial name
- Paraplagiomus tragiscoides (Breuning, 1939)

Genus of beetles

Paraplagiomus tragiscoides is a species of beetle in the family Cerambycidae, and the only species in the genus Paraplagiomus. It was described by Stephan von Breuning in 1939.
