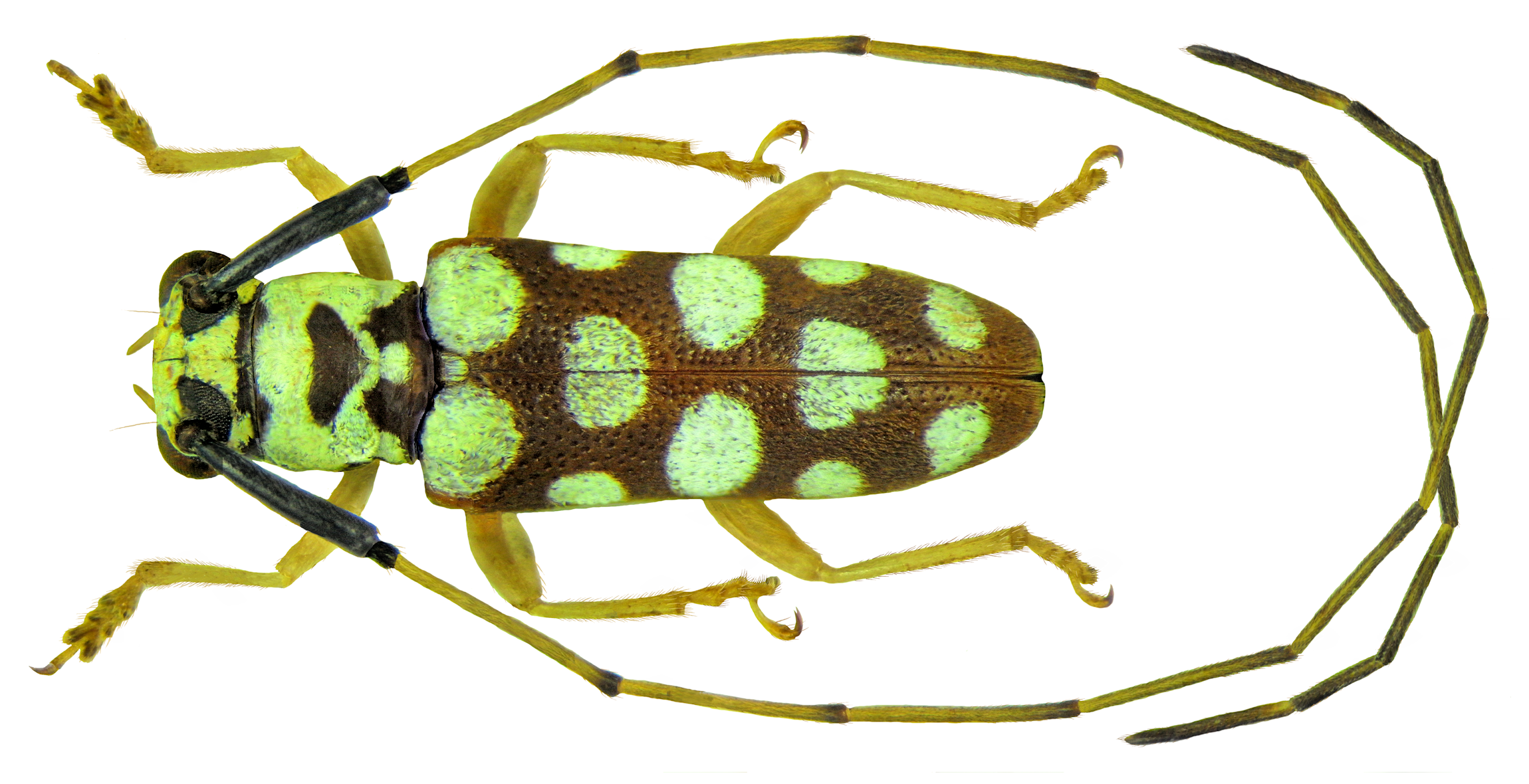
- Size: 5.7 mm

Scientific classification
- Kingdom: Animalia
- Phylum: Arthropoda
- Class: Insecta
- Order: Coleoptera
- Suborder: Polyphaga
- Infraorder: Cucujiformia
- Family: Cerambycidae
- Genus: Parachariesthes
- Species: P. marshalli

Binomial name
- Parachariesthes marshalli Breuning, 1934

= Parachariesthes =

Genus of beetles

Parachariesthes marshalli is a species of beetle in the family Cerambycidae, and the only species in the genus Parachariesthes. It was described by Stephan von Breuning in 1934.
