= Baliesthes =

Scientific classification
- Kingdom: Animalia
- Phylum: Arthropoda
- Class: Insecta
- Order: Coleoptera
- Suborder: Polyphaga
- Infraorder: Cucujiformia
- Family: Cerambycidae
- Genus: Baliesthes
- Species: B. alboguttatus

Binomial name
- Baliesthes alboguttatus (Fairmaire, 1885)

Genus of beetles

Baliesthes alboguttatus is a species of beetle in the family Cerambycidae, and the only species in the genus Baliesthes. It was described by Fairmaire in 1885.
