= Baliesthoides =

Scientific classification
- Kingdom: Animalia
- Phylum: Arthropoda
- Class: Insecta
- Order: Coleoptera
- Suborder: Polyphaga
- Infraorder: Cucujiformia
- Family: Cerambycidae
- Genus: Baliesthoides
- Species: B. guttipennis

Binomial name
- Baliesthoides guttipennis Breuning, 1958

Genus of beetles

Baliesthoides guttipennis is a species of beetle in the family Cerambycidae, and the only species in the genus Baliesthoides. It was described by Stephan von Breuning in 1958.
