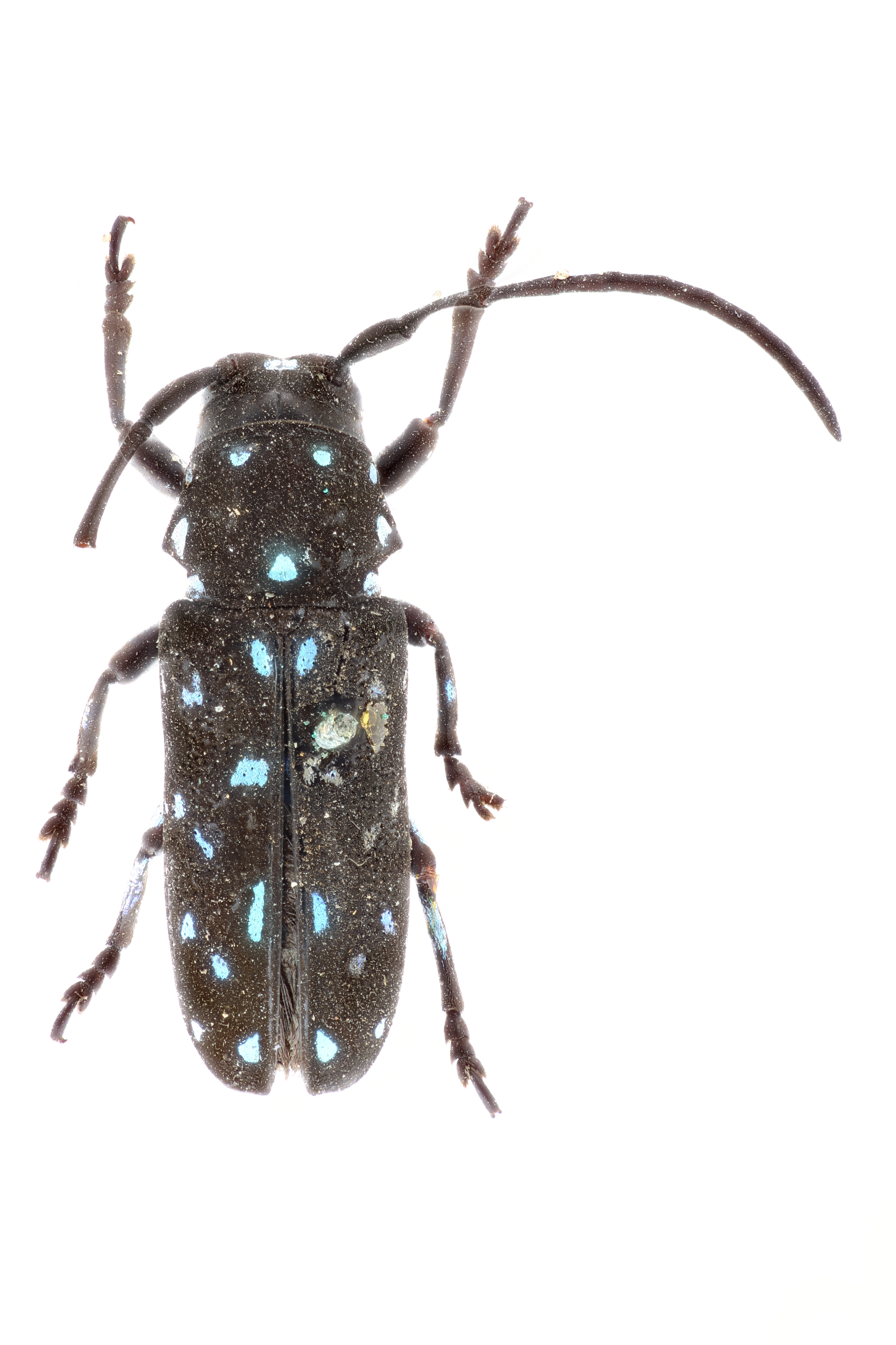

Scientific classification
- Kingdom: Animalia
- Phylum: Arthropoda
- Class: Insecta
- Order: Coleoptera
- Suborder: Polyphaga
- Infraorder: Cucujiformia
- Family: Cerambycidae
- Genus: Melanopais
- Species: M. gemmaria

Binomial name
- Melanopais gemmaria (White, 1856)

= Melanopais =

Genus of beetles

Melanopais gemmaria is a species of beetle in the family Cerambycidae, and the only species in the genus Melanopais. It was described by White in 1856.
