= Paradinocephalus =

Scientific classification
- Kingdom: Animalia
- Phylum: Arthropoda
- Class: Insecta
- Order: Coleoptera
- Suborder: Polyphaga
- Infraorder: Cucujiformia
- Family: Cerambycidae
- Genus: Paradinocephalus
- Species: P. collarti

Binomial name
- Paradinocephalus collarti Breuning, 1954

Genus of beetles

Paradinocephalus collarti is a species of beetle in the family Cerambycidae, and the only species in the genus Paradinocephalus. It was described by Stephan von Breuning in 1954.
