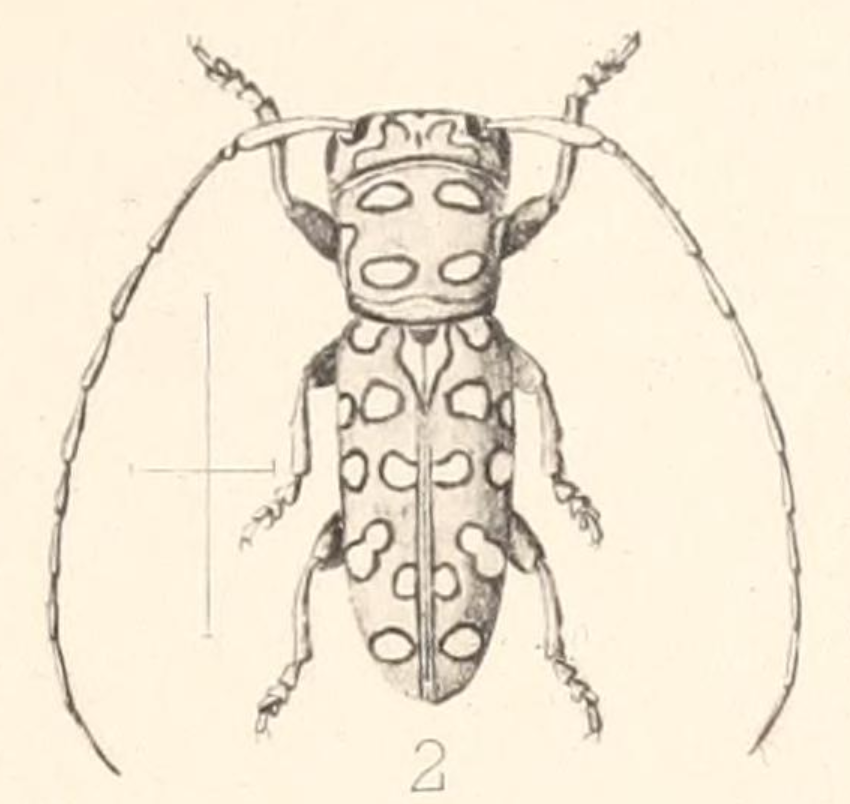
- Dinocephalus ornatus

Scientific classification
- Kingdom: Animalia
- Phylum: Arthropoda
- Class: Insecta
- Order: Coleoptera
- Suborder: Polyphaga
- Infraorder: Cucujiformia
- Family: Cerambycidae
- Subfamily: Lamiinae
- Genus: Dinocephalus; Péringuey, 1899

= Dinocephalus =

Genus of beetles

Dinocephalus is a genus of longhorn beetles of the subfamily Lamiinae, containing the following species:

- Dinocephalus alboguttatus Breuning, 1958
- Dinocephalus haafi Breuning, 1961
- Dinocephalus heissi Holzschuh, 1991
- Dinocephalus ocellatus Aurivillius, 1908
- Dinocephalus ornatus Peringuey, 1899
