= Phosphorus (Thrace) =

Town of ancient Thrace

Coordinates: 41°11′48″N 29°05′11″E

Phosphorus was a town of ancient Thrace, inhabited during Roman times.

Its site is located near Karataş Çiftliği in European Turkey.
