= Paragraciella =

Scientific classification
- Kingdom: Animalia
- Phylum: Arthropoda
- Class: Insecta
- Order: Coleoptera
- Suborder: Polyphaga
- Infraorder: Cucujiformia
- Family: Cerambycidae
- Genus: Paragraciella
- Species: P. schoudeteni

Binomial name
- Paragraciella schoudeteni Breuning, 1934

Genus of beetles

Paragraciella schoudeteni is a species of beetle in the family Cerambycidae, and the only species in the genus Paragraciella. It was described by Stephan von Breuning in 1934.
