= Pseudimalmus =

Scientific classification
- Kingdom: Animalia
- Phylum: Arthropoda
- Class: Insecta
- Order: Coleoptera
- Suborder: Polyphaga
- Infraorder: Cucujiformia
- Family: Cerambycidae
- Genus: Pseudimalmus
- Species: P. fasciatus

Binomial name
- Pseudimalmus fasciatus (Hintz, 1919)

Genus of beetles

Pseudimalmus fasciatus is a species of beetle in the family Cerambycidae, and the only species in the genus Pseudimalmus. It was described by Hintz in 1919.
