= Cornuchariesthes =

Scientific classification
- Kingdom: Animalia
- Phylum: Arthropoda
- Class: Insecta
- Order: Coleoptera
- Suborder: Polyphaga
- Infraorder: Cucujiformia
- Family: Cerambycidae
- Genus: Cornuchariesthes
- Species: C. albomaculata

Binomial name
- Cornuchariesthes albomaculata Breuning, 1981

Genus of beetles

Cornuchariesthes albomaculata is a species of beetle in the family Cerambycidae, and the only species in the genus Cornuchariesthes. It was described by Stephan von Breuning in 1981.
