= Anachariesthes =

Scientific classification
- Kingdom: Animalia
- Phylum: Arthropoda
- Class: Insecta
- Order: Coleoptera
- Suborder: Polyphaga
- Infraorder: Cucujiformia
- Family: Cerambycidae
- Genus: Anachariesthes
- Species: A. abyssinica

Binomial name
- Anachariesthes abyssinica Müller, 1949

Genus of beetles

Anachariesthes abyssinica is a species of beetle in the family Cerambycidae, and the only species in the genus Anachariesthes. It was described by Müller in 1949.
