= Anaplagiomus =

Scientific classification
- Kingdom: Animalia
- Phylum: Arthropoda
- Class: Insecta
- Order: Coleoptera
- Suborder: Polyphaga
- Infraorder: Cucujiformia
- Family: Cerambycidae
- Genus: Anaplagiomus
- Species: A. garnieri

Binomial name
- Anaplagiomus garnieri Téocchi, 1994

Genus of beetles

Anaplagiomus garnieri is a species of beetle in the family Cerambycidae, and the only species in the genus Anaplagiomus. It was described by Téocchi in 1994.
