= Spilotragoides =

Scientific classification
- Kingdom: Animalia
- Phylum: Arthropoda
- Class: Insecta
- Order: Coleoptera
- Suborder: Polyphaga
- Infraorder: Cucujiformia
- Family: Cerambycidae
- Genus: Spilotragoides
- Species: S. griseomaculatus

Binomial name
- Spilotragoides griseomaculatus Breuning, 1981

Genus of beetles

Spilotragoides griseomaculatus is a species of beetle in the family Cerambycidae, and the only species in the genus Spilotragoides. It was described by Stephan von Breuning in 1981.
