= Spinochariesthes =

Scientific classification
- Kingdom: Animalia
- Phylum: Arthropoda
- Class: Insecta
- Order: Coleoptera
- Suborder: Polyphaga
- Infraorder: Cucujiformia
- Family: Cerambycidae
- Genus: Spinochariesthes
- Species: S. albomaculata

Binomial name
- Spinochariesthes albomaculata Breuning, 1970

Genus of beetles

Spinochariesthes albomaculata is a species of beetle in the family Cerambycidae, and the only species in the genus Spinochariesthes. It was described by Stephan von Breuning in 1970.
