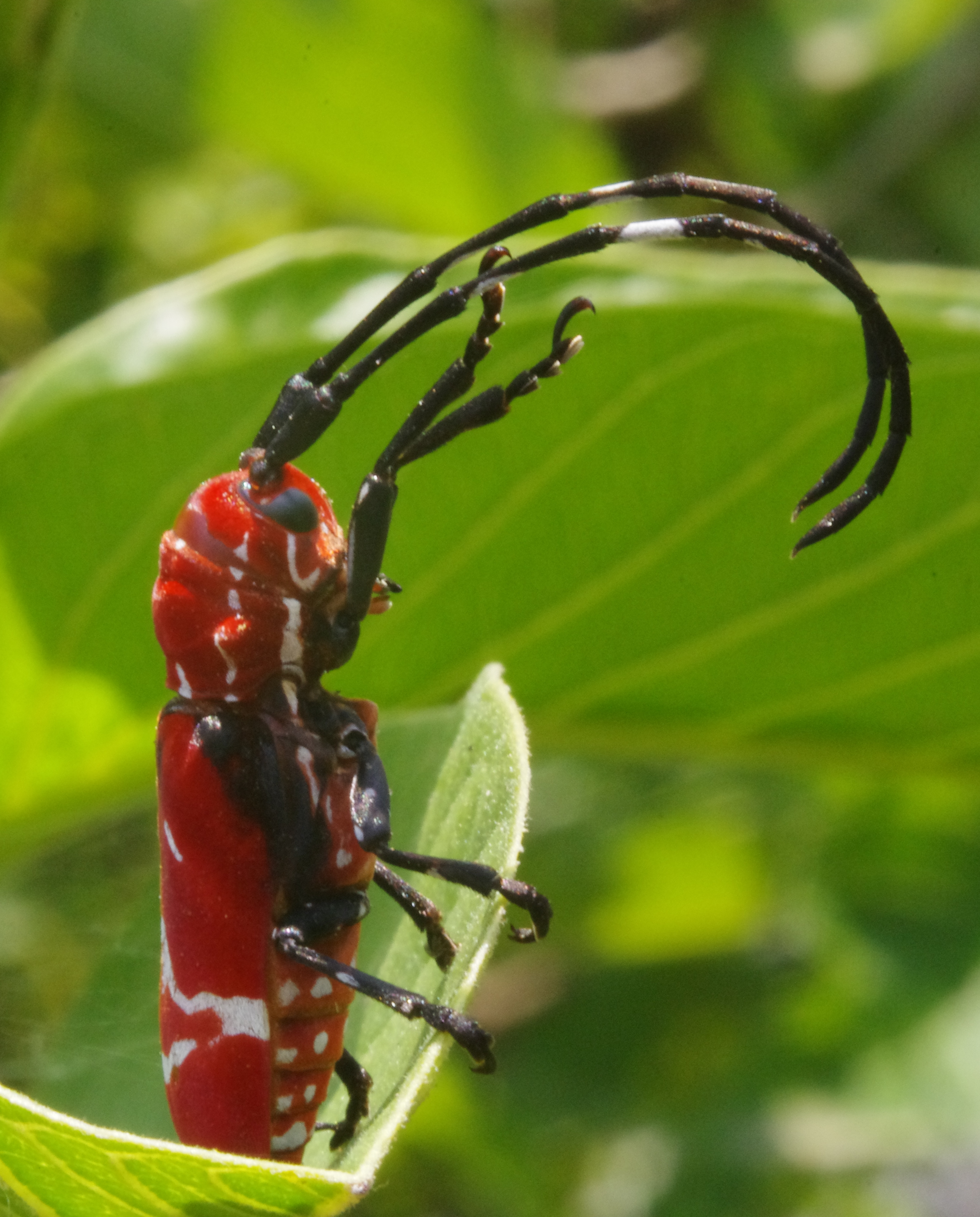
- Callimation venustum

Scientific classification
- Kingdom: Animalia
- Phylum: Arthropoda
- Class: Insecta
- Order: Coleoptera
- Suborder: Polyphaga
- Infraorder: Cucujiformia
- Family: Cerambycidae
- Subfamily: Lamiinae
- Tribe: Tragocephalini
- Genus: Callimation; Blanchard, 1844

= Callimation =

Genus of beetles

Callimation is a genus of longhorn beetles of the subfamily Lamiinae, containing the following species:

- Callimation apicale Aurivillius, 1908
- Callimation corallinum Fiedler, 1939
- Callimation pontificum Thomson, 1857
- Callimation venustum Guérin-Méneville, 1844
