= Cedemon =

Scientific classification
- Kingdom: Animalia
- Phylum: Arthropoda
- Class: Insecta
- Order: Coleoptera
- Suborder: Polyphaga
- Infraorder: Cucujiformia
- Family: Cerambycidae
- Genus: Cedemon
- Species: C. tristis

Binomial name
- Cedemon tristis Gahan, 1890

Genus of beetles

Cedemon tristis is a species of beetle in the family Cerambycidae, and the only species in the genus Cedemon. It was described by Gahan in 1890.
