= Chemsakiellus =

Scientific classification
- Kingdom: Animalia
- Phylum: Arthropoda
- Clade: Pancrustacea
- Class: Insecta
- Order: Coleoptera
- Suborder: Polyphaga
- Infraorder: Cucujiformia
- Family: Cerambycidae
- Genus: Chemsakiellus
- Species: C. taurus

Binomial name
- Chemsakiellus taurus Villiers, 1982

Genus of beetles

Chemsakiellus taurus is a species of beetle in the family Cerambycidae, and the only species in the genus Chemsakiellus. It was described by Villiers in 1982.
