= Plagiomus =

Scientific classification
- Kingdom: Animalia
- Phylum: Arthropoda
- Class: Insecta
- Order: Coleoptera
- Suborder: Polyphaga
- Infraorder: Cucujiformia
- Family: Cerambycidae
- Genus: Plagiomus
- Species: P. multinotatus

Binomial name
- Plagiomus multinotatus Quedenfeldt, 1888

Genus of beetles

Plagiomus multinotatus is a species of beetle in the family Cerambycidae, and the only species in the genus Plagiomus. It was described by Quedenfeldt in 1888.
