= Pseudotragiscus =

Scientific classification
- Kingdom: Animalia
- Phylum: Arthropoda
- Class: Insecta
- Order: Coleoptera
- Suborder: Polyphaga
- Infraorder: Cucujiformia
- Family: Cerambycidae
- Genus: Pseudotragiscus
- Species: P. venus

Binomial name
- Pseudotragiscus venus (Jordan, 1903)

Genus of beetles

Pseudotragiscus venus is a species of beetle in the family Cerambycidae, and the only species in the genus Pseudotragiscus. It was described by Karl Jordan in 1903.
