= Dodechariesthes =

Scientific classification
- Kingdom: Animalia
- Phylum: Arthropoda
- Class: Insecta
- Order: Coleoptera
- Suborder: Polyphaga
- Infraorder: Cucujiformia
- Family: Cerambycidae
- Genus: Dodechariesthes
- Species: D. erlangeri

Binomial name
- Dodechariesthes erlangeri (Breuning, 1960)

Genus of beetles

Dodechariesthes erlangeri is a species of beetle in the family Cerambycidae, and the only species in the genus Dodechariesthes. It was described by Stephan von Breuning in 1960.
