= Scapochariesthes =

Scientific classification
- Kingdom: Animalia
- Phylum: Arthropoda
- Class: Insecta
- Order: Coleoptera
- Suborder: Polyphaga
- Infraorder: Cucujiformia
- Family: Cerambycidae
- Genus: Scapochariesthes
- Species: S. nigroapicipennis

Binomial name
- Scapochariesthes nigroapicipennis Breuning, 1948

Genus of beetles

Scapochariesthes nigroapicipennis is a species of beetle in the family Cerambycidae, and the only species in the genus Scapochariesthes. It was described by Stephan von Breuning in 1948.
