= Falsonyctopais =

Scientific classification
- Kingdom: Animalia
- Phylum: Arthropoda
- Class: Insecta
- Order: Coleoptera
- Suborder: Polyphaga
- Infraorder: Cucujiformia
- Family: Cerambycidae
- Genus: Falsonyctopais
- Species: F. lamottei

Binomial name
- Falsonyctopais lamottei Lepesme, 1949

Genus of beetles

Falsonyctopais lamottei is a species of beetle in the family Cerambycidae, and the only species in the genus Falsonyctopais. It was described by Lepesme in 1949.
