= Mimochariesthes =

Scientific classification
- Kingdom: Animalia
- Phylum: Arthropoda
- Class: Insecta
- Order: Coleoptera
- Suborder: Polyphaga
- Infraorder: Cucujiformia
- Family: Cerambycidae
- Genus: Mimochariesthes
- Species: M. flaveola

Binomial name
- Mimochariesthes flaveola Téocchi, 1986

Genus of beetles

Mimochariesthes flaveola is a species of beetle in the family Cerambycidae, and the only species in the genus Mimochariesthes. It was described by Téocchi in 1986.
