= Falsotragiscus =

Scientific classification
- Kingdom: Animalia
- Phylum: Arthropoda
- Class: Insecta
- Order: Coleoptera
- Suborder: Polyphaga
- Infraorder: Cucujiformia
- Family: Cerambycidae
- Genus: Falsotragiscus
- Species: F. holdhausi

Binomial name
- Falsotragiscus holdhausi (Itzinger, 1934)

Genus of beetles

Falsotragiscus holdhausi is a species of beetle in the family Cerambycidae, and the only species in the genus Falsotragiscus. It was described by Itzinger in 1934.
