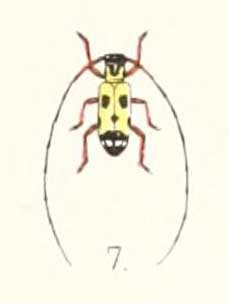

Scientific classification
- Kingdom: Animalia
- Phylum: Arthropoda
- Class: Insecta
- Order: Coleoptera
- Suborder: Polyphaga
- Infraorder: Cucujiformia
- Family: Cerambycidae
- Genus: Pseudochariesthes
- Species: P. nobilis

Binomial name
- Pseudochariesthes nobilis (Jordan, 1894)

Synonyms
- Chariesthes nobilis Jordan, 1894

= Pseudochariesthes nobilis =

Species of beetle

Pseudochariesthes nobilis is a species of beetle in the family Cerambycidae. It was described by Karl Jordan in 1894, originally under the genus Chariesthes.
