= Isochariesthes francoisi =

Scientific classification
- Kingdom: Animalia
- Phylum: Arthropoda
- Class: Insecta
- Order: Coleoptera
- Suborder: Polyphaga
- Infraorder: Cucujiformia
- Family: Cerambycidae
- Genus: Isochariesthes
- Species: I. francoisi

Binomial name
- Isochariesthes francoisi (Breuning, 1972)

Synonyms
- Pseudochariesthes francoisi Breuning, 1972; Pseudochariesthes paratestui Breuning, 1986

Species of beetle

Isochariesthes francoisi is a species of beetle in the family Cerambycidae. It was described by Stephan von Breuning in 1972, originally under the genus Pseudochariesthes.

== Subspecies ==
- Isochariesthes francoisi decempunctata Adlbauer, 1997
- Isochariesthes francoisi francoisi (Breuning, 1972)
