= Chariesthes albovariegata =

Scientific classification
- Kingdom: Animalia
- Phylum: Arthropoda
- Class: Insecta
- Order: Coleoptera
- Suborder: Polyphaga
- Infraorder: Cucujiformia
- Family: Cerambycidae
- Genus: Chariesthes
- Species: C. albovariegata

Binomial name
- Chariesthes albovariegata (Breuning, 1938)

Synonyms
- Freapomecyna albovariegata (Breuning) Téocchi (1989); Freapomecyna rougemonti Breuning, 1977; Pseudotragocephala albovariegata Breuning, 1938

Species of beetle

Chariesthes albovariegata is a species of beetle in the family Cerambycidae. It was described by Stephan von Breuning in 1938, originally under the genus Pseudotragocephala. It is known from Somalia, Kenya and Ethiopia.
