= Isochariesthes multiguttata =

Scientific classification
- Kingdom: Animalia
- Phylum: Arthropoda
- Class: Insecta
- Order: Coleoptera
- Suborder: Polyphaga
- Infraorder: Cucujiformia
- Family: Cerambycidae
- Genus: Isochariesthes
- Species: I. multiguttata

Binomial name
- Isochariesthes multiguttata (Hunt & Breuning, 1955)

Synonyms
- Pseudochariesthes multiguttata Hunt & Breuning, 1955

Species of beetle

Isochariesthes multiguttata is a species of beetle in the family Cerambycidae. It was described by Hunt and Stephan von Breuning in 1955, originally under the genus Pseudochariesthes. It is known from Eswatini and South Africa. It measures between 7 and 7.5 mm (0.28 and 0.30 in).
