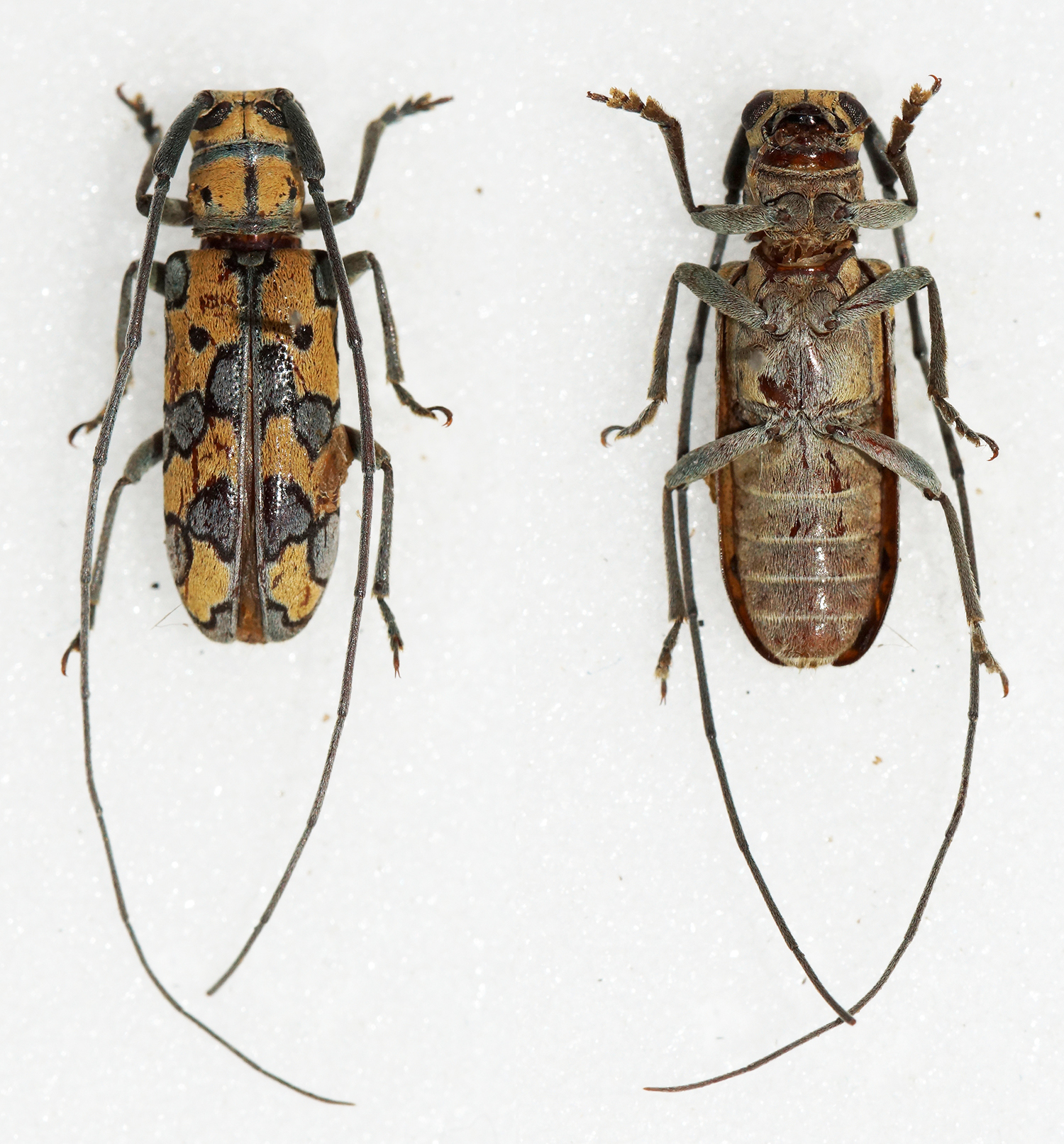

Scientific classification
- Domain: Eukaryota
- Kingdom: Animalia
- Phylum: Arthropoda
- Class: Insecta
- Order: Coleoptera
- Suborder: Polyphaga
- Infraorder: Cucujiformia
- Family: Cerambycidae
- Genus: Isochariesthes
- Species: I. breuningstefi

Binomial name
- Isochariesthes breuningstefi (Teocchi, 1985)

Synonyms
- Pseudochariesthes breuningstefi Teocchi, 1985; Pseudochariesthes breuningstefi m. forchhammeri (Breuning) Teocchi, 1990; Pseudochariesthes forchhammeri Breuning, 1986

= Isochariesthes breuningstefi =

Species of beetle

Isochariesthes breuningstefi is a species of beetle in the family Cerambycidae. It was described by Pierre Téocchi in 1985, originally under the genus Pseudochariesthes.
