= Isochariesthes lesnei =

Scientific classification
- Kingdom: Animalia
- Phylum: Arthropoda
- Class: Insecta
- Order: Coleoptera
- Suborder: Polyphaga
- Infraorder: Cucujiformia
- Family: Cerambycidae
- Genus: Isochariesthes
- Species: I. lesnei

Binomial name
- Isochariesthes lesnei (Breuning, 1934)

Synonyms
- Isochariesthes lesnei m. galathea Téocchi & Sudre, 2003; Isochariesthes lesnei m. rhodesiana Téocchi & Sudre, 2003; Pseudochariesthes lesnei Breuning, 1934; Pseudochariesthes lesnei m. albida Breuning, 1981

Species of beetle

Isochariesthes lesnei is a species of beetle in the family Cerambycidae. It was described by Stephan von Breuning in 1934, originally under the genus Pseudochariesthes.

== Subspecies ==
- Isochariesthes lesnei lesnei (Breuning, 1934)
- Isochariesthes lesnei sudanica (Breuning, 1962)

== Varietas ==
- Isochariesthes lesnei var. lockleyi (Breuning, 1934)
- Isochariesthes lesnei var. sulphurea (Breuning, 1939)
