= Isochariesthes tricolor =

Scientific classification
- Kingdom: Animalia
- Phylum: Arthropoda
- Class: Insecta
- Order: Coleoptera
- Suborder: Polyphaga
- Infraorder: Cucujiformia
- Family: Cerambycidae
- Genus: Isochariesthes
- Species: I. tricolor

Binomial name
- Isochariesthes tricolor (Breuning, 1964)

Synonyms
- Pseudochariesthes villiersi Teocchi, 1986; Chariesthes tricolor Breuning, 1964; Pseudochariesthes tricolor m. trichroma Teocchi, 1990; Pseudochariesthes tricolor (Breuning) Téocchi, 1990

Species of beetle

Isochariesthes tricolor is a species of beetle in the family Cerambycidae. It was described by Stephan von Breuning in 1964, originally under the genus Chariesthes. It is known from the Democratic Republic of the Congo.
