= Chariesthes grisescens =

Scientific classification
- Kingdom: Animalia
- Phylum: Arthropoda
- Class: Insecta
- Order: Coleoptera
- Suborder: Polyphaga
- Infraorder: Cucujiformia
- Family: Cerambycidae
- Genus: Chariesthes
- Species: C. grisescens

Binomial name
- Chariesthes grisescens (Breuning, 1981)

Synonyms
- Isochariesthes grisescens (Breuning) Téocchi, 1993; Pseudochariesthes grisescens Breuning, 1981

Species of beetle

Chariesthes grisescens is a species of beetle in the family Cerambycidae. It was described by Stephan von Breuning in 1981, originally under the genus Pseudochariesthes. It is known from Kenya.
