= Isochariesthes moucheti =

Scientific classification
- Kingdom: Animalia
- Phylum: Arthropoda
- Class: Insecta
- Order: Coleoptera
- Suborder: Polyphaga
- Infraorder: Cucujiformia
- Family: Cerambycidae
- Genus: Isochariesthes
- Species: I. moucheti

Binomial name
- Isochariesthes moucheti (Breuning, 1965)

Species of beetle

Isochariesthes moucheti is a species of beetle in the family Cerambycidae. It was described by Stephan von Breuning in 1965.
