= Chariesthes maublanci =

Scientific classification
- Kingdom: Animalia
- Phylum: Arthropoda
- Class: Insecta
- Order: Coleoptera
- Suborder: Polyphaga
- Infraorder: Cucujiformia
- Family: Cerambycidae
- Genus: Chariesthes
- Species: C. maublanci

Binomial name
- Chariesthes maublanci Lepesme & Breuning, 1950

Species of beetle

Chariesthes maublanci is a species of beetle in the family Cerambycidae. It was described by Lepesme and Stephan von Breuning in 1950. It is known from Gabon.
