= Isochariesthes picta =

Scientific classification
- Kingdom: Animalia
- Phylum: Arthropoda
- Class: Insecta
- Order: Coleoptera
- Suborder: Polyphaga
- Infraorder: Cucujiformia
- Family: Cerambycidae
- Genus: Isochariesthes
- Species: I. picta

Binomial name
- Isochariesthes picta (Breuning, 1938)

Synonyms
- Pseudochariesthes picta m. ruahae Teocchi, 1991; Pseudochariestes picta Breuning, 1938 (misspelling); Pseudochariesthes picta Breuning, 1938

Species of beetle

Isochariesthes picta is a species of beetle in the family Cerambycidae. It was described by Stephan von Breuning in 1938.
