= Isochariesthes braini =

Scientific classification
- Kingdom: Animalia
- Phylum: Arthropoda
- Class: Insecta
- Order: Coleoptera
- Suborder: Polyphaga
- Infraorder: Cucujiformia
- Family: Cerambycidae
- Genus: Isochariesthes
- Species: I. braini

Binomial name
- Isochariesthes braini (Breuning, 1981)

Species of beetle

Isochariesthes braini is a species of beetle in the family Cerambycidae. It was described by Stephan von Breuning in 1981.
