= Chariesthes nigroapicalis =

Scientific classification
- Kingdom: Animalia
- Phylum: Arthropoda
- Class: Insecta
- Order: Coleoptera
- Suborder: Polyphaga
- Infraorder: Cucujiformia
- Family: Cerambycidae
- Genus: Chariesthes
- Species: C. nigroapicalis

Binomial name
- Chariesthes nigroapicalis (Aurivillius, 1903)

Synonyms
- Peritragus nigroapicalis Aurivillius, 1903

Species of beetle

Chariesthes nigroapicalis is a species of beetle in the family Cerambycidae. It was described by Per Olof Christopher Aurivillius in 1903 and is known from Tanzania.
