= Chariesthes sesensis =

Scientific classification
- Kingdom: Animalia
- Phylum: Arthropoda
- Class: Insecta
- Order: Coleoptera
- Suborder: Polyphaga
- Infraorder: Cucujiformia
- Family: Cerambycidae
- Genus: Chariesthes
- Species: C. sesensis

Binomial name
- Chariesthes sesensis (Hintz, 1912)

Species of beetle

Chariesthes sesensis is a species of beetle in the family Cerambycidae. It was described by Hintz in 1912. It is known from Uganda.
