= Chariesthes obscura =

Scientific classification
- Kingdom: Animalia
- Phylum: Arthropoda
- Class: Insecta
- Order: Coleoptera
- Suborder: Polyphaga
- Infraorder: Cucujiformia
- Family: Cerambycidae
- Genus: Chariesthes
- Species: C. obscura

Binomial name
- Chariesthes obscura (Gahan, 1890)

Synonyms
- Chariesthes (Pseudohapheniastus) ugandicola Breuning, 1967; Chariesthes obscura m. holzschuhi Téocchi, 1991; Chariesthes subunicolor Hunt & Breuning, 1966; Chariesthes subunicolor var. pictulus Hunt & Breuning, 1966; Freapomecyna allardi Breuning, 1969; Freapomecynoides angolensis Breuning, 1978; Parabelodasys fuscosignata Breuning, 1986; Phymasterna obscura Gahan, 1890

Species of beetle

Chariesthes obscura is a species of beetle in the family Cerambycidae. It was described by Charles Joseph Gahan in 1890, originally under the genus Phymasterna. It has a wide distribution in Africa.
