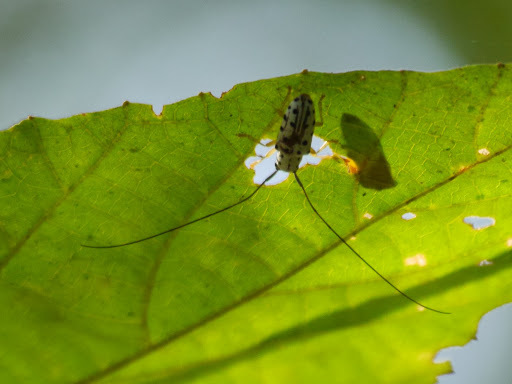

Scientific classification
- Kingdom: Animalia
- Phylum: Arthropoda
- Clade: Pancrustacea
- Class: Insecta
- Order: Coleoptera
- Suborder: Polyphaga
- Infraorder: Cucujiformia
- Family: Cerambycidae
- Genus: Chariesthes
- Species: C. multinotata

Binomial name
- Chariesthes multinotata Chevrolat, 1858

= Chariesthes multinotata =

Species of beetle

Chariesthes multinotata is a species of beetle in the family Cerambycidae. It was first described by Chevrolat in 1858. It has a wide distribution in Africa.
