= Pseudochariesthes nigroguttata =

Scientific classification
- Kingdom: Animalia
- Phylum: Arthropoda
- Class: Insecta
- Order: Coleoptera
- Suborder: Polyphaga
- Infraorder: Cucujiformia
- Family: Cerambycidae
- Genus: Pseudochariesthes
- Species: P. nigroguttata

Binomial name
- Pseudochariesthes nigroguttata (Aurivillius, 1908)

Synonyms
- Isochariesthes nigroguttata (Aurivillius) Teocchi, 1993; Chariesthes nigroguttata Aurivillius, 1908

Species of beetle

Pseudochariesthes nigroguttata is a species of beetle in the family Cerambycidae. It was described by Per Olof Christopher Aurivillius in 1908.
