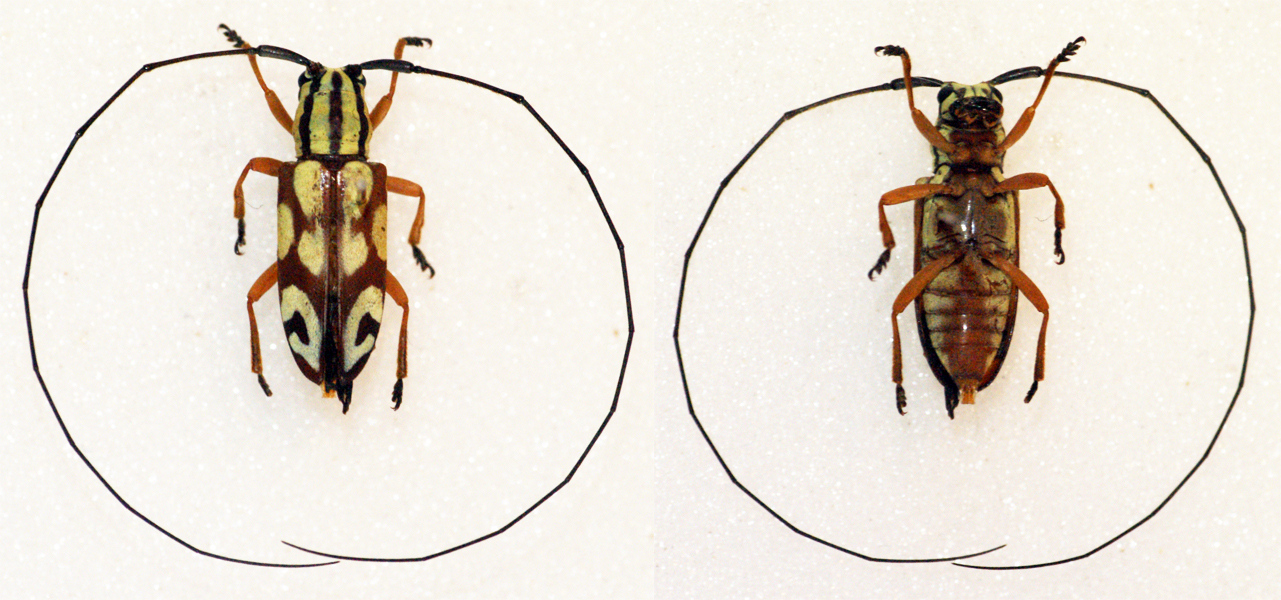

Scientific classification
- Kingdom: Animalia
- Phylum: Arthropoda
- Class: Insecta
- Order: Coleoptera
- Suborder: Polyphaga
- Infraorder: Cucujiformia
- Family: Cerambycidae
- Genus: Chariesthes
- Species: C. antennata

Binomial name
- Chariesthes antennata Jordan, 1894

Synonyms
- Chariesths affinis Jordan, 1903

= Chariesthes antennata =

Species of beetle

Chariesthes antennata is a species of beetle in the family Cerambycidae. It was described by Karl Jordan in 1894. It is known from Equatorial Guinea, Nigeria, the Democratic Republic of the Congo, Gabon and Cameroon.
