= Isochariesthes eurychroma =

Scientific classification
- Domain: Eukaryota
- Kingdom: Animalia
- Phylum: Arthropoda
- Class: Insecta
- Order: Coleoptera
- Suborder: Polyphaga
- Infraorder: Cucujiformia
- Family: Cerambycidae
- Genus: Isochariesthes
- Species: I. eurychroma

Binomial name
- Isochariesthes eurychroma (Téocchi, 1990)

Species of beetle

Isochariesthes eurychroma is a species of beetle in the family Cerambycidae. It was described by Pierre Téocchi in 1990.
