= Chariesthes ruficollis =

Scientific classification
- Kingdom: Animalia
- Phylum: Arthropoda
- Class: Insecta
- Order: Coleoptera
- Suborder: Polyphaga
- Infraorder: Cucujiformia
- Family: Cerambycidae
- Genus: Chariesthes
- Species: C. ruficollis

Binomial name
- Chariesthes ruficollis Breuning, 1942

Synonyms
- Pseudochariesthes euchromoides Breuning, 1986; Chariesthes eurychroma Téocchi, 1990

Species of beetle

Chariesthes ruficollis is a species of beetle in the family Cerambycidae. It was described by Stephan von Breuning in 1942. It is known from Somalia.
