= Isochariesthes tripunctata =

Scientific classification
- Domain: Eukaryota
- Kingdom: Animalia
- Phylum: Arthropoda
- Class: Insecta
- Order: Coleoptera
- Suborder: Polyphaga
- Infraorder: Cucujiformia
- Family: Cerambycidae
- Genus: Isochariesthes
- Species: I. tripunctata

Binomial name
- Isochariesthes tripunctata (Aurivillius, 1903)

Synonyms
- Hapheniastus discodes Jordan, 1903; Chariesthes tripunctata Aurivillius, 1903; Pseudochariesthes tripunctata m. isabellae Breuning & Teocchi, 1973; Pseudochariesthes tripunctata (Aurivillius) Breuning, 1934

Species of beetle

Isochariesthes tripunctata is a species of beetle in the family Cerambycidae. It was described by Per Olof Christopher Aurivillius in 1903. It is known from Gabon, Cameroon, the Republic of the Congo, the Democratic Republic of the Congo, and Equatorial Guinea.
