= Chariesthes nigropunctata =

Scientific classification
- Kingdom: Animalia
- Phylum: Arthropoda
- Class: Insecta
- Order: Coleoptera
- Suborder: Polyphaga
- Infraorder: Cucujiformia
- Family: Cerambycidae
- Genus: Chariesthes
- Species: C. nigropunctata

Binomial name
- Chariesthes nigropunctata Breuning, 1934

Species of beetle

Chariesthes nigropunctata is a species of beetle in the family Cerambycidae. It was described by Stephan von Breuning in 1934. It is known from the Democratic Republic of the Congo and South Africa.
