= Chariesthes formosa =

Scientific classification
- Kingdom: Animalia
- Phylum: Arthropoda
- Class: Insecta
- Order: Coleoptera
- Suborder: Polyphaga
- Infraorder: Cucujiformia
- Family: Cerambycidae
- Genus: Chariesthes
- Species: C. formosa

Binomial name
- Chariesthes formosa Jordan, 1894

Species of beetle

Chariesthes formosa is a species of beetle in the family Cerambycidae. It was described by Karl Jordan in 1894. It is known from Gabon.
