= Isochariesthes transversevitticollis =

Scientific classification
- Kingdom: Animalia
- Phylum: Arthropoda
- Class: Insecta
- Order: Coleoptera
- Suborder: Polyphaga
- Infraorder: Cucujiformia
- Family: Cerambycidae
- Genus: Isochariesthes
- Species: I. transversevitticollis

Binomial name
- Isochariesthes transversevitticollis (Breuning, 1955)

Species of beetle

Isochariesthes transversevitticollis is a species of beetle in the family Cerambycidae. It was described by Stephan von Breuning in 1955.
