= Chariesthes argentea =

Scientific classification
- Kingdom: Animalia
- Phylum: Arthropoda
- Class: Insecta
- Order: Coleoptera
- Suborder: Polyphaga
- Infraorder: Cucujiformia
- Family: Cerambycidae
- Genus: Chariesthes
- Species: C. argentea

Binomial name
- Chariesthes argentea Hintz, 1912

Species of beetle

Chariesthes argentea is a species of beetle in the family Cerambycidae. It was described by Hintz in 1912. It is known from the Democratic Republic of the Congo and Uganda.
