= Chariesthes leonensis =

Scientific classification
- Kingdom: Animalia
- Phylum: Arthropoda
- Class: Insecta
- Order: Coleoptera
- Suborder: Polyphaga
- Infraorder: Cucujiformia
- Family: Cerambycidae
- Genus: Chariesthes
- Species: C. leonensis

Binomial name
- Chariesthes leonensis Breuning, 1939

Synonyms
- Chariesthes aureovitticollis Lepesme & Breuning, 1950; Chariesthes flavolineata Lepesme & Breuning, 1950; Chariesthes liberiae Breuning, 1974

Species of beetle

Chariesthes leonensis is a species of beetle in the family Cerambycidae. It was described by Stephan von Breuning in 1939. It is known from Liberia, Senegal, the Ivory Coast, Guinea, and Sierra Leone.
