= Chariesthes rubra =

Scientific classification
- Kingdom: Animalia
- Phylum: Arthropoda
- Clade: Pancrustacea
- Class: Insecta
- Order: Coleoptera
- Suborder: Polyphaga
- Infraorder: Cucujiformia
- Family: Cerambycidae
- Genus: Chariesthes
- Species: C. rubra

Binomial name
- Chariesthes rubra (Hintz, 1912)

Synonyms
- Apheniastus ruber Hintz, 1912; Auriolus ruber (Hintz) Téocchi, 1984; Auriolus ruber m. nigripennis Téocchi, 1984; Auriolus rufuloides Lepesme & Breuning, 1950; Auriolus rufuloides m. nigritarsis Lepesme & Breuning, 1952

Species of beetle

Chariesthes rubra is a species of beetle in the family Cerambycidae. It was described by Hintz in 1912, originally under the genus Apheniastus. It is known from Cameroon and the Central African Republic.
