= Chariesthes laetula =

Scientific classification
- Kingdom: Animalia
- Phylum: Arthropoda
- Class: Insecta
- Order: Coleoptera
- Suborder: Polyphaga
- Infraorder: Cucujiformia
- Family: Cerambycidae
- Genus: Chariesthes
- Species: C. laetula

Binomial name
- Chariesthes laetula (Péringuey, 1899)

Synonyms
- Tragiscoschema laetula Péringuey, 1899

Species of beetle

Chariesthes laetula is a species of beetle in the family Cerambycidae. It was described by Péringuey in 1899, originally under the genus Tragiscoschema. It is known from Tanzania, Mozambique and Zimbabwe.
