= Isochariesthes brunneopunctipennis =

Scientific classification
- Kingdom: Animalia
- Phylum: Arthropoda
- Class: Insecta
- Order: Coleoptera
- Suborder: Polyphaga
- Infraorder: Cucujiformia
- Family: Cerambycidae
- Genus: Isochariesthes
- Species: I. brunneopunctipennis

Binomial name
- Isochariesthes brunneopunctipennis (Hunt & Breuning, 1966)

Species of beetle

Isochariesthes brunneopunctipennis is a species of beetle in the family Cerambycidae. It was described by Hunt and Stephan von Breuning in 1966.
