= Chariesthes apicalis =

Scientific classification
- Kingdom: Animalia
- Phylum: Arthropoda
- Class: Insecta
- Order: Coleoptera
- Suborder: Polyphaga
- Infraorder: Cucujiformia
- Family: Cerambycidae
- Genus: Chariesthes
- Species: C. apicalis

Binomial name
- Chariesthes apicalis (Péringuey, 1885)

Synonyms
- Tragiscoschema apicalis Péringuey, 1885

Species of beetle

Chariesthes apicalis is a species of beetle in the family Cerambycidae. It was described by Péringuey in 1885, originally under the genus Tragiscoschema. It has a wide distribution in Africa.
