= Chariesthes interruptevitticollis =

Scientific classification
- Kingdom: Animalia
- Phylum: Arthropoda
- Class: Insecta
- Order: Coleoptera
- Suborder: Polyphaga
- Infraorder: Cucujiformia
- Family: Cerambycidae
- Genus: Chariesthes
- Species: C. interruptevitticollis

Binomial name
- Chariesthes interruptevitticollis Breuning, 1960

Species of beetle

Chariesthes interruptevitticollis is a species of beetle in the family Cerambycidae. It was described by Stephan von Breuning in 1960. It is known from Kenya.
