= Isochariesthes fulvoplagiatoides =

Scientific classification
- Kingdom: Animalia
- Phylum: Arthropoda
- Class: Insecta
- Order: Coleoptera
- Suborder: Polyphaga
- Infraorder: Cucujiformia
- Family: Cerambycidae
- Genus: Isochariesthes
- Species: I. fulvoplagiatoides

Binomial name
- Isochariesthes fulvoplagiatoides (Breuning, 1959)

Species of beetle

Isochariesthes fulvoplagiatoides is a species of beetle in the family Cerambycidae. It was described by Stephan von Breuning in 1959.
