= Pseudochariesthes plena =

Scientific classification
- Kingdom: Animalia
- Phylum: Arthropoda
- Class: Insecta
- Order: Coleoptera
- Suborder: Polyphaga
- Infraorder: Cucujiformia
- Family: Cerambycidae
- Genus: Pseudochariesthes
- Species: P. plena

Binomial name
- Pseudochariesthes plena (Jordan, 1903)

Species of beetle

Pseudochariesthes plena is a species of beetle in the family Cerambycidae. It was described by Karl Jordan in 1903.
