= Chariesthes ertli =

Scientific classification
- Kingdom: Animalia
- Phylum: Arthropoda
- Class: Insecta
- Order: Coleoptera
- Suborder: Polyphaga
- Infraorder: Cucujiformia
- Family: Cerambycidae
- Genus: Chariesthes
- Species: C. ertli

Binomial name
- Chariesthes ertli (Aurivillius, 1913)

Synonyms
- Peritragus ertli Aurivillius, 1913

Species of beetle

Chariesthes ertli is a species of beetle in the family Cerambycidae. It was described by Per Olof Christopher Aurivillius in 1913, originally under the genus Peritragus. It is known from the Democratic Republic of the Congo and Angola.
