= Isochariesthes ugandicola =

Scientific classification
- Kingdom: Animalia
- Phylum: Arthropoda
- Class: Insecta
- Order: Coleoptera
- Suborder: Polyphaga
- Infraorder: Cucujiformia
- Family: Cerambycidae
- Genus: Isochariesthes
- Species: I. ugandicola

Binomial name
- Isochariesthes ugandicola (Breuning, 1963)

Synonyms
- Pseudochariesthes ugandicola Breuning, 1963

Species of beetle

Isochariesthes ugandicola is a species of beetle in the family Cerambycidae. It was described by Stephan von Breuning in 1963.
