= Isochariesthes fuscocaudata =

Scientific classification
- Domain: Eukaryota
- Kingdom: Animalia
- Phylum: Arthropoda
- Class: Insecta
- Order: Coleoptera
- Suborder: Polyphaga
- Infraorder: Cucujiformia
- Family: Cerambycidae
- Genus: Isochariesthes
- Species: I. fuscocaudata

Binomial name
- Isochariesthes fuscocaudata (Fiedler, 1939)

Species of beetle

Isochariesthes fuscocaudata is a species of beetle in the family Cerambycidae. It was described by Fiedler in 1939.
