= Chariesthes fairmairei =

Scientific classification
- Kingdom: Animalia
- Phylum: Arthropoda
- Class: Insecta
- Order: Coleoptera
- Suborder: Polyphaga
- Infraorder: Cucujiformia
- Family: Cerambycidae
- Genus: Chariesthes
- Species: C. fairmairei

Binomial name
- Chariesthes fairmairei (Aurivillius, 1922)

Synonyms
- Chariesthes apicalis Fairmaire, 1894 nec Péringuey, 1885; Hapheniastus apicalis (Fairmaire) Jordan, 1903; Hapheniastus fairmairei Aurivillius, 1922

Species of beetle

Chariesthes fairmairei is a species of beetle in the family Cerambycidae. It was described by Per Olof Christopher Aurivillius in 1922, originally under the genus Hapheniastus. It is known from the Central African Republic and Gabon.
