= Chariesthes amoena =

Scientific classification
- Kingdom: Animalia
- Phylum: Arthropoda
- Class: Insecta
- Order: Coleoptera
- Suborder: Polyphaga
- Infraorder: Cucujiformia
- Family: Cerambycidae
- Genus: Chariesthes
- Species: C. amoena

Binomial name
- Chariesthes amoena (Dalman, 1817)

Synonyms
- Chariesthes quadrivittata Jordan, 1894; Lamia amoena Dalman, 1817; Scapochariesthoides viridicollis Breuning, 1978

Species of beetle

Chariesthes amoena is a species of beetle in the family Cerambycidae. It was described by Dalman in 1817, originally under the genus Lamia. It is known from the Central African Republic, Gabon, the Democratic Republic of the Congo, Cameroon, Nigeria, the Ivory Coast, and Sierra Leone.
