= Chariesthes angolensis =

Scientific classification
- Kingdom: Animalia
- Phylum: Arthropoda
- Class: Insecta
- Order: Coleoptera
- Suborder: Polyphaga
- Infraorder: Cucujiformia
- Family: Cerambycidae
- Genus: Chariesthes
- Species: C. angolensis

Binomial name
- Chariesthes angolensis Breuning, 1968

Species of beetle

Chariesthes angolensis is a species of beetle in the family Cerambycidae. It was described by Stephan von Breuning in 1968. It is known from Angola.
