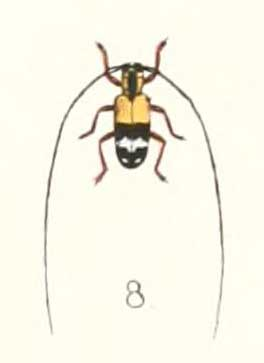

Scientific classification
- Kingdom: Animalia
- Phylum: Arthropoda
- Class: Insecta
- Order: Coleoptera
- Suborder: Polyphaga
- Infraorder: Cucujiformia
- Family: Cerambycidae
- Genus: Chariesthes
- Species: C. freya

Binomial name
- Chariesthes freya Jordan, 1894

= Chariesthes freya =

Species of beetle

Chariesthes freya is a species of beetle in the family Cerambycidae. It was described by Karl Jordan in 1894. It is known from the Ivory Coast, Gabon, the Republic of the Congo, and the Democratic Republic of the Congo. It contains the variety Chariesthes freya var. itzingeri.
