= Isochariesthes breuningi =

Scientific classification
- Domain: Eukaryota
- Kingdom: Animalia
- Phylum: Arthropoda
- Class: Insecta
- Order: Coleoptera
- Suborder: Polyphaga
- Infraorder: Cucujiformia
- Family: Cerambycidae
- Genus: Isochariesthes
- Species: I. breuningi

Binomial name
- Isochariesthes breuningi (Gilmour, 1954)

Species of beetle

Isochariesthes breuningi is a species of beetle in the family Cerambycidae. It was described by E. Forrest Gilmour in 1954.
