= Isochariesthes flavescens =

Scientific classification
- Kingdom: Animalia
- Phylum: Arthropoda
- Class: Insecta
- Order: Coleoptera
- Suborder: Polyphaga
- Infraorder: Cucujiformia
- Family: Cerambycidae
- Genus: Isochariesthes
- Species: I. flavescens

Binomial name
- Isochariesthes flavescens (Breuning, 1959)

Species of beetle

Isochariesthes flavescens is a species of beetle in the family Cerambycidae. It was described by Stephan von Breuning in 1959.
