= Isochariesthes euchroma =

Scientific classification
- Kingdom: Animalia
- Phylum: Arthropoda
- Class: Insecta
- Order: Coleoptera
- Suborder: Polyphaga
- Infraorder: Cucujiformia
- Family: Cerambycidae
- Genus: Isochariesthes
- Species: I. euchroma

Binomial name
- Isochariesthes euchroma (Breuning, 1970)

Species of beetle

Isochariesthes euchroma is a species of beetle in the family Cerambycidae. It was described by Stephan von Breuning in 1970.
