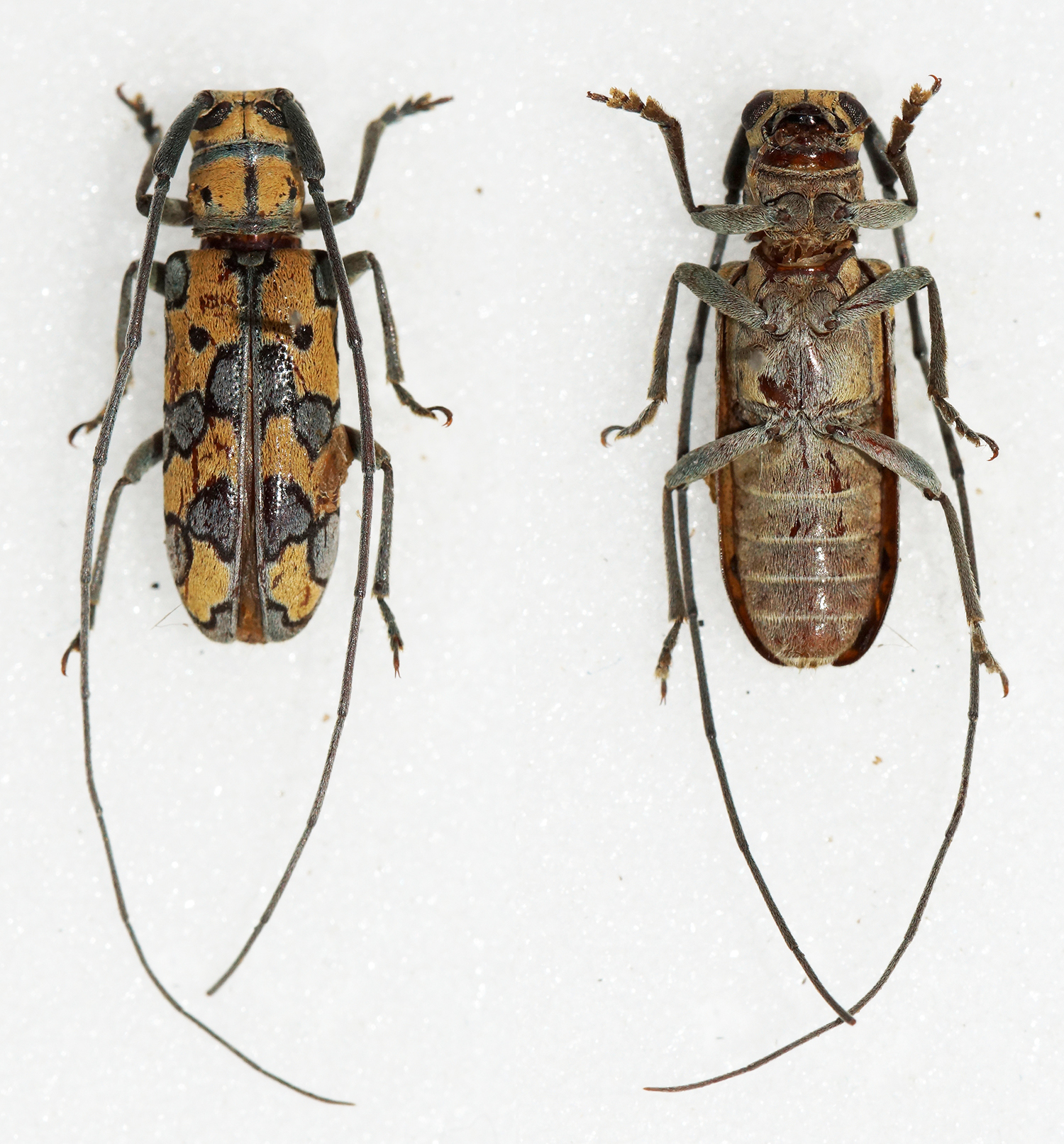
- Isochariesthes breuningstefi

Scientific classification
- Domain: Eukaryota
- Kingdom: Animalia
- Phylum: Arthropoda
- Class: Insecta
- Order: Coleoptera
- Suborder: Polyphaga
- Infraorder: Cucujiformia
- Family: Cerambycidae
- Subfamily: Lamiinae
- Tribe: Tragocephalini
- Genus: Isochariesthes; Teocchi, 1993

= Isochariesthes =

Genus of beetles

Isochariesthes is a genus of longhorn beetles of the subfamily Lamiinae, containing the following species:

- Isochariesthes arrowi (Breuning, 1934)
- Isochariesthes braini (Breuning, 1981)
- Isochariesthes breuningi (Gilmour, 1954)
- Isochariesthes breuningstefi (Teocchi, 1985)
- Isochariesthes brunneomaculata (Breuning, 1977)
- Isochariesthes brunneopunctipennis (Hunt & Breuning, 1966)
- Isochariesthes ciferrii (Breuning, 1940)
- Isochariesthes epupaensis Adlbauer, 2002
- Isochariesthes euchroma (Breuning, 1970)
- Isochariesthes euchromoides (Breuning, 1981)
- Isochariesthes eurychroma (Téocchi, 1990)
- Isochariesthes flava (Fiedler, 1939)
- Isochariesthes flavescens (Breuning, 1959)
- Isochariesthes flavoguttata (Aurivillius, 1913)
- Isochariesthes francoisi (Breuning, 1972)
- Isochariesthes fulvoplagiatoides (Breuning, 1959)
- Isochariesthes furva (Fiedler, 1939)
- Isochariesthes fuscocaudata (Fiedler, 1939)
- Isochariesthes grundaeva (Fiedler, 1939)
- Isochariesthes lesnei (Breuning, 1934)
- Isochariesthes ludibunda (Fiedler, 1939)
- Isochariesthes moucheti (Breuning, 1965)
- Isochariesthes multiguttata (Hunt & Breuning, 1955)
- Isochariesthes picta (Breuning, 1938)
- Isochariesthes suturalis (Aurivillius, 1914)
- Isochariesthes transversevitticollis (Breuning, 1955)
- Isochariesthes tricolor (Breuning, 1964)
- Isochariesthes tripunctata (Aurivillius, 1903)
- Isochariesthes ugandicola (Breuning, 1963)
- Isochariesthes undulatovittata (Breuning, 1962)
- Isochariesthes variegata (Breuning, 1939)
