= Isochariesthes flavoguttata =

Scientific classification
- Domain: Eukaryota
- Kingdom: Animalia
- Phylum: Arthropoda
- Class: Insecta
- Order: Coleoptera
- Suborder: Polyphaga
- Infraorder: Cucujiformia
- Family: Cerambycidae
- Genus: Isochariesthes
- Species: I. flavoguttata

Binomial name
- Isochariesthes flavoguttata (Aurivillius, 1913)

Synonyms
- Chariesthes flavoguttata Aurivillius, 1913; Pseudochariesthes flavoguttata (Aurivillius) Breuning, 1934

Species of beetle

Isochariesthes flavoguttata is a species of beetle in the family Cerambycidae. It was described by Per Olof Christopher Aurivillius in 1913.
