= Isochariesthes epupaensis =

Scientific classification
- Domain: Eukaryota
- Kingdom: Animalia
- Phylum: Arthropoda
- Class: Insecta
- Order: Coleoptera
- Suborder: Polyphaga
- Infraorder: Cucujiformia
- Family: Cerambycidae
- Genus: Isochariesthes
- Species: I. epupaensis

Binomial name
- Isochariesthes epupaensis Adlbauer, 2002

Species of beetle

Isochariesthes epupaensis is a species of beetle in the family Cerambycidae. It was described by Adlbauer in 2002. It is known from Namibia.
