= Pseudochariesthes superba =

Scientific classification
- Kingdom: Animalia
- Phylum: Arthropoda
- Class: Insecta
- Order: Coleoptera
- Suborder: Polyphaga
- Infraorder: Cucujiformia
- Family: Cerambycidae
- Genus: Pseudochariesthes
- Species: P. superba

Binomial name
- Pseudochariesthes superba Breuning, 1962

Species of beetle

Pseudochariesthes superba is a species of beetle in the family Cerambycidae with a yellow to brown body with black spots. It was described by Stephan von Breuning in 1962.
