= Chariesthes cervina =

Scientific classification
- Kingdom: Animalia
- Phylum: Arthropoda
- Class: Insecta
- Order: Coleoptera
- Suborder: Polyphaga
- Infraorder: Cucujiformia
- Family: Cerambycidae
- Genus: Chariesthes
- Species: C. cervina

Binomial name
- Chariesthes cervina (Hintz, 1910)

Synonyms
- Mimiculus cervinus Hintz, 1910

Species of beetle

Chariesthes cervina is a species of beetle in the family Cerambycidae. It was described by Hintz in 1910. It is known from Tanzania.
