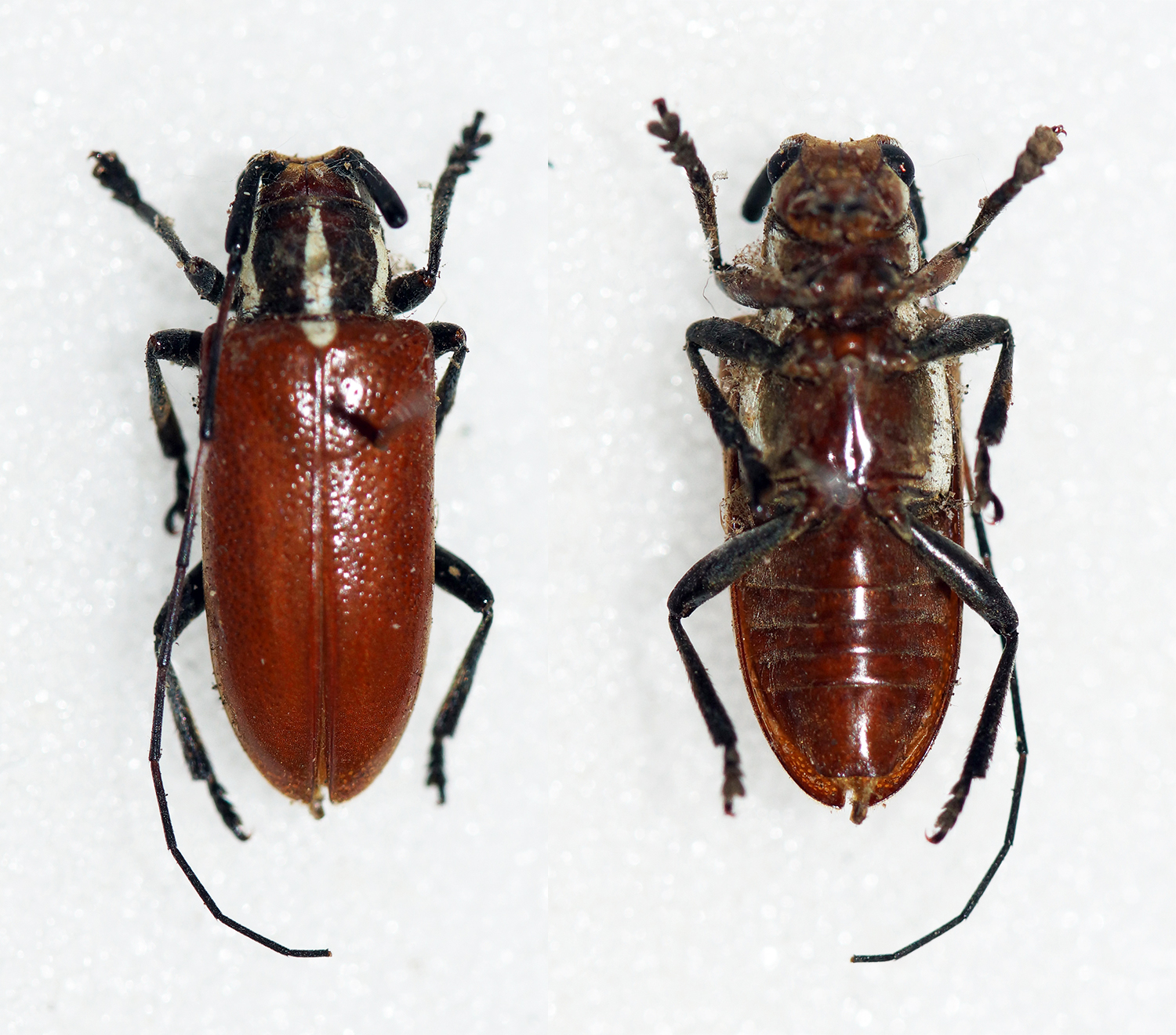

Scientific classification
- Kingdom: Animalia
- Phylum: Arthropoda
- Class: Insecta
- Order: Coleoptera
- Suborder: Polyphaga
- Infraorder: Cucujiformia
- Family: Cerambycidae
- Genus: Chariesthes
- Species: C. richteri

Binomial name
- Chariesthes richteri Quedenfeldt, 1887

= Chariesthes richteri =

Species of beetle

Chariesthes richteri is a species of beetle in the family Cerambycidae. It was described by Quedenfeldt in 1887. It is known from the Central African Republic, Gabon, the Democratic Republic of the Congo, Cameroon, the Republic of the Congo, and Equatorial Guinea.
