= Isochariesthes arrowi =

Scientific classification
- Kingdom: Animalia
- Phylum: Arthropoda
- Class: Insecta
- Order: Coleoptera
- Suborder: Polyphaga
- Infraorder: Cucujiformia
- Family: Cerambycidae
- Genus: Isochariesthes
- Species: I. arrowi

Binomial name
- Isochariesthes arrowi (Breuning, 1934)

Synonyms
- Pseudochariesthes arrowi Breuning, 1934

Species of beetle

Isochariesthes arrowi is a species of beetle in the family Cerambycidae. It was described by Stephan von Breuning in 1934.

== Subspecies ==
- Isochariesthes arrowi arrowi (Breuning, 1934)
- Isochariesthes arrowi murphyi (Téocchi, 1989)
