= Parahyagnis =

Scientific classification
- Kingdom: Animalia
- Phylum: Arthropoda
- Class: Insecta
- Order: Coleoptera
- Suborder: Polyphaga
- Infraorder: Cucujiformia
- Family: Cerambycidae
- Tribe: Apomecynini
- Genus: Parahyagnis; Breuning, 1939

Type species
- Parahyagnis auratoides Breuning, 1939

Genus of beetles

Parahyagnis is a genus of beetles in the family Cerambycidae, containing the following species:

- Parahyagnis bifuscoplagiata Breuning, 1970
- Parahyagnis ficivora (Pascoe, 1864)
