= Chariesthes donovani =

Scientific classification
- Kingdom: Animalia
- Phylum: Arthropoda
- Class: Insecta
- Order: Coleoptera
- Suborder: Polyphaga
- Infraorder: Cucujiformia
- Family: Cerambycidae
- Genus: Chariesthes
- Species: C. donovani

Binomial name
- Chariesthes donovani (Jordan, 1903)

Synonyms
- Chariesthes striata Fiedler, 1939; Chariesthes wilmoti Lepesme & Breuning, 1955; Hapheniastus donovani Jordan, 1903; Chariesthes donowani (Jordan, 1903) (misspelling); Hapheniastus donowani Jordan, 1903 (misspelling)

Species of beetle

Chariesthes donovani is a species of beetle in the family Cerambycidae. It was described by Karl Jordan in 1903, originally under the genus Hapheniastus. It is known from Sierra Leone, Cameroon, Ivory Coast, Gabon, Benin, Ghana, and Togo. It measures approximately 10 mm (0.39 in).
