= Isochariesthes variegata =

Scientific classification
- Kingdom: Animalia
- Phylum: Arthropoda
- Class: Insecta
- Order: Coleoptera
- Suborder: Polyphaga
- Infraorder: Cucujiformia
- Family: Cerambycidae
- Genus: Isochariesthes
- Species: I. variegata

Binomial name
- Isochariesthes variegata (Breuning, 1939)

Species of beetle

Isochariesthes variegata is a species of beetle in the family Cerambycidae. It was described by Stephan von Breuning in 1939.
