= Isochariesthes grundaeva =

Scientific classification
- Domain: Eukaryota
- Kingdom: Animalia
- Phylum: Arthropoda
- Class: Insecta
- Order: Coleoptera
- Suborder: Polyphaga
- Infraorder: Cucujiformia
- Family: Cerambycidae
- Genus: Isochariesthes
- Species: I. grundaeva

Binomial name
- Isochariesthes grundaeva (Fiedler, 1939)

Species of beetle

Isochariesthes grundaeva is a species of beetle in the family Cerambycidae. It was described by Fiedler in 1939.
