= Chariesthes euchroma =

Scientific classification
- Kingdom: Animalia
- Phylum: Arthropoda
- Class: Insecta
- Order: Coleoptera
- Suborder: Polyphaga
- Infraorder: Cucujiformia
- Family: Cerambycidae
- Genus: Chariesthes
- Species: C. euchroma

Binomial name
- Chariesthes euchroma (Fairmaire, 1904)

Synonyms
- Sternotomis euchroma Fairmaire, 1904

Species of beetle

Chariesthes euchroma is a species of beetle in the family Cerambycidae. It was described by Léon Fairmaire in 1904, originally under the genus Sternotomis. It is known from Madagascar.

The species is combined with the Chariesthes genus ranked in the Tragocephalini tribe of Lamiinae.
