= Chariesthes socotraensis =

Scientific classification
- Kingdom: Animalia
- Phylum: Arthropoda
- Class: Insecta
- Order: Coleoptera
- Suborder: Polyphaga
- Infraorder: Cucujiformia
- Family: Cerambycidae
- Genus: Chariesthes
- Species: C. socotraensis

Binomial name
- Chariesthes socotraensis Adlbauer, 2002

Species of beetle

Chariesthes socotraensis is a species of beetle in the family Cerambycidae. It was described by Adlbauer in 2002. It is known from Yemen.
