= Chariesthes rubida =

Scientific classification
- Kingdom: Animalia
- Phylum: Arthropoda
- Class: Insecta
- Order: Coleoptera
- Suborder: Polyphaga
- Infraorder: Cucujiformia
- Family: Cerambycidae
- Genus: Chariesthes
- Species: C. rubida

Binomial name
- Chariesthes rubida (Chevrolat, 1855)

Synonyms
- Apheniastus rubidus (Chevrolat, 1855); Hapheniastus rubidus (Chevrolat, 1855); Mesosa rubida Chevrolat, 1855

Species of beetle

Chariesthes rubida is a species of beetle in the family Cerambycidae. It was described by Chevrolat in 1855, originally under the genus Mesosa. It is known from the Democratic Republic of the Congo, the Central African Republic, Cameroon, Equatorial Guinea, Nigeria, and Gabon. It contains the varietas Chariesthes rubida var. femoralis.
