= Parahyagnis ficivora =

Scientific classification
- Kingdom: Animalia
- Phylum: Arthropoda
- Class: Insecta
- Order: Coleoptera
- Suborder: Polyphaga
- Infraorder: Cucujiformia
- Family: Cerambycidae
- Genus: Parahyagnis
- Species: P. ficivora

Binomial name
- Parahyagnis ficivora (Pascoe, 1864)

Synonyms
- Alphitopola ficivora Pascoe, 1864; Alphitopola rugosipennis Fahraeus, 1872; Chariesthes (Peritragopsis) ficivora (Pascoe, 1864); Parahyagnis auratoides Breuning, 1939; Prosopocera (Alphitopola) ficivora (Pascoe, 1864)

Species of insect

Parahyagnis ficivora is a species of beetle in the family Cerambycidae. It was described by Francis Polkinghorne Pascoe in 1864, originally under the genus Alphitopola. It is known from South Africa. It contains the varietas Parahyagnis ficivora var. intricata.
