= Pseudotragocephala =

Scientific classification
- Kingdom: Animalia
- Phylum: Arthropoda
- Clade: Pancrustacea
- Class: Insecta
- Order: Coleoptera
- Suborder: Polyphaga
- Infraorder: Cucujiformia
- Family: Cerambycidae
- Genus: Pseudotragocephala
- Species: P. nigropicta

Binomial name
- Pseudotragocephala nigropicta (Fairmaire, 1893)

Synonyms
- Tragocephala nigropicta Fairmaire, 1893

Genus of beetles

Pseudotragocephala nigropicta is a species of beetle in the family Cerambycidae, and the only species in the genus Pseudotragocephala. It was described by Fairmaire in 1893. The species is endemic to endemic to Mayotte.
