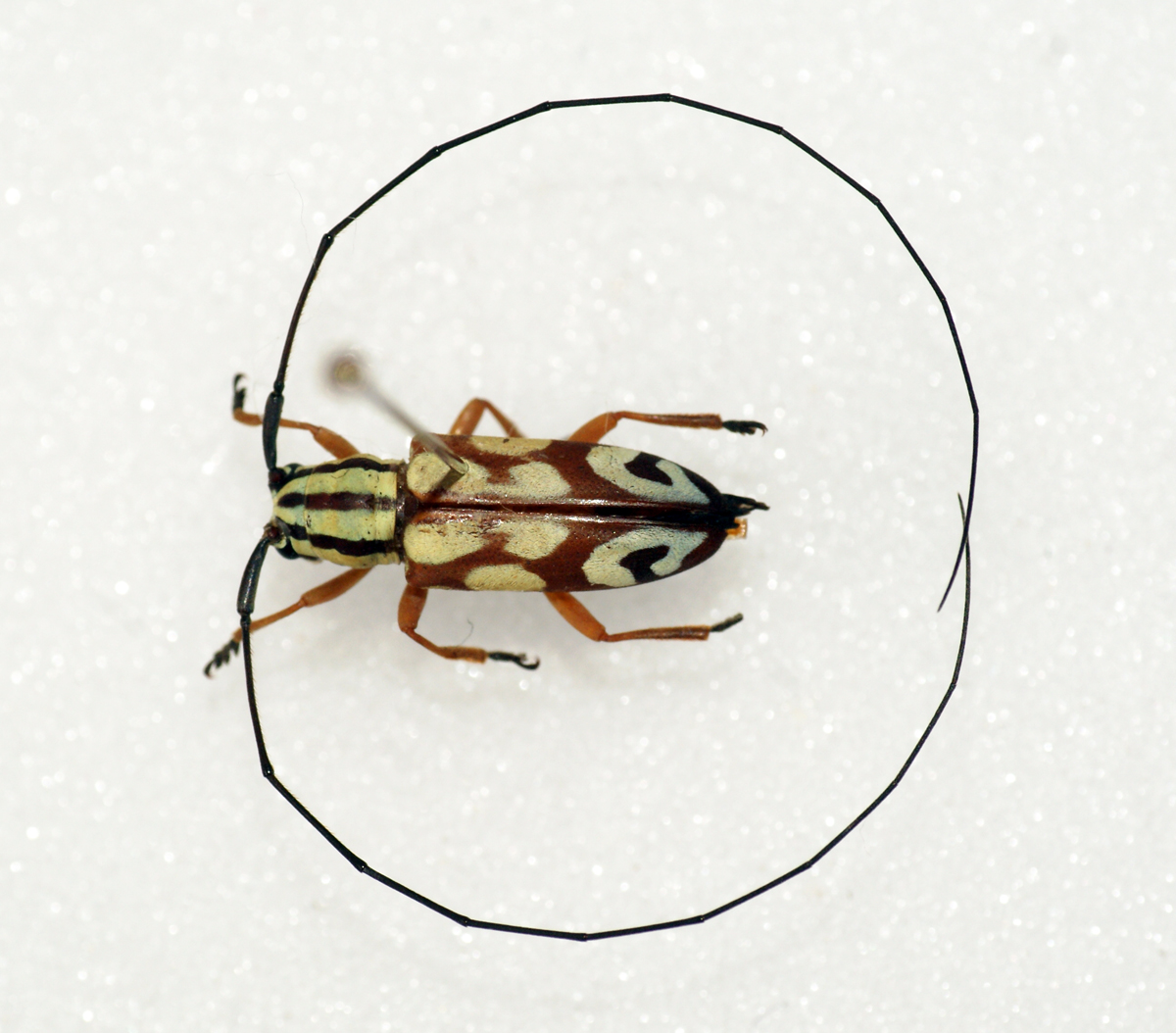
- Chariesthes antennata

Scientific classification
- Kingdom: Animalia
- Phylum: Arthropoda
- Class: Insecta
- Order: Coleoptera
- Suborder: Polyphaga
- Infraorder: Cucujiformia
- Family: Cerambycidae
- Subfamily: Lamiinae
- Tribe: Tragocephalini
- Genus: Chariesthes; Chevrolat, 1858

= Chariesthes =

Genus of beetles

Chariesthes is a genus of longhorn beetles of the subfamily Lamiinae, containing the following species:

subgenus Chariesthes

- Chariesthes amoena (Dalman, 1817)
- Chariesthes analis (Jordan, 1894)
- Chariesthes antennata Jordan, 1894
- Chariesthes argentea Hintz, 1912
- Chariesthes atroapicalis Breuning, 1951
- Chariesthes basiflavipennis Breuning, 1938
- Chariesthes bechynei Breuning, 1953
- Chariesthes bella (Dalman, 1817)
- Chariesthes fairmairei (Aurivillius, 1922)
- Chariesthes formosa Jordan, 1894
- Chariesthes freya Jordan, 1894
- Chariesthes gestroi Breuning, 1934
- Chariesthes grisescens (Breuning, 1981)
- Chariesthes insularis Breuning, 1939
- Chariesthes kochi Breuning, 1962
- Chariesthes leonensis Breuning, 1939
- Chariesthes lomii Breuning, 1938
- Chariesthes maublanci Lepesme & Breuning, 1950
- Chariesthes maynei Breuning, 1952
- Chariesthes multinotata Chevrolat, 1858
- Chariesthes nigronotata Breuning, 1956
- Chariesthes nigropunctata Breuning, 1934
- Chariesthes pulchelloides Breuning, 1939
- Chariesthes richteri Quedenfeldt, 1887
- Chariesthes rubida (Chevrolat, 1855)
- Chariesthes ruficollis Breuning, 1942
- Chariesthes rutila (Jordan, 1894)
- Chariesthes schatzmayri Breuning, 1940
- Chariesthes sesensis (Hintz, 1912)
- Chariesthes somaliensis Breuning, 1934
- Chariesthes striata Fiedler, 1939
- Chariesthes subtricolor Breuning, 1967
- Chariesthes trivitticollis Breuning, 1977

subgenus Peritragopsis

- Chariesthes ficivora (Pascoe, 1864)

subgenus Peritragus

- Chariesthes apicalis (Péringuey, 1885)
- Chariesthes ertli (Aurivillius, 1913)
- Chariesthes interruptevitticollis Breuning, 1960
- Chariesthes laetula (Péringuey, 1899)
- Chariesthes nigroapicalis (Aurivillius, 1903)
- Chariesthes obliquevittata Breuning, 1960
- Chariesthes similis Breuning, 1938

subgenus Pseudoapheniastus

- Chariesthes albovariegata (Breuning, 1938)
- Chariesthes angolensis Breuning, 1968
- Chariesthes cervina (Hintz, 1910)
- Chariesthes chassoti Breuning, 1969
- Chariesthes congoensis Breuning, 1948
- Chariesthes donovani (Jordan, 1903)
- Chariesthes euchroma (Fairmaire, 1904)
- Chariesthes nigroapicipennis Breuning, 1977
- Chariesthes obscura (Gahan, 1890)
- Chariesthes rubra (Hintz, 1912)

subgenus Sokothesthes

- Chariesthes socotraensis Adlbauer, 2002
