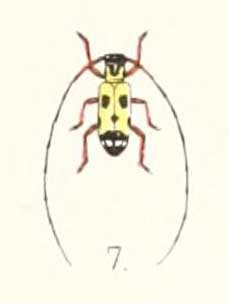
- Pseudochariesthes nobilis

Scientific classification
- Kingdom: Animalia
- Phylum: Arthropoda
- Class: Insecta
- Order: Coleoptera
- Suborder: Polyphaga
- Infraorder: Cucujiformia
- Family: Cerambycidae
- Subfamily: Lamiinae
- Tribe: Tragocephalini
- Genus: Pseudochariesthes; Breuning, 1934

= Pseudochariesthes =

Genus of beetles

Pseudochariesthes is a genus of longhorn beetles of the subfamily Lamiinae, containing the following species:

- Pseudochariesthes nigroguttata (Aurivillius, 1908)
- Pseudochariesthes nobilis (Jordan, 1894)
- Pseudochariesthes plena (Jordan, 1903)
- Pseudochariesthes superba Breuning, 1962
