= Callistola attenuata =

Scientific classification
- Kingdom: Animalia
- Phylum: Arthropoda
- Clade: Pancrustacea
- Class: Insecta
- Order: Coleoptera
- Suborder: Polyphaga
- Infraorder: Cucujiformia
- Family: Chrysomelidae
- Genus: Callistola
- Species: C. attenuata

Binomial name
- Callistola attenuata Gressitt, 1963

Species of beetle

Callistola attenuata is a species of beetle of the family Chrysomelidae. It is found in south-western and north-western New Guinea.

== Description ==
Adults reach a length of about 8.3 mm. They are yellowish testaceous to black, the pronotum with a triangular apical pitchy black area. The elytra are testaceous on upper portion of the basal half and mostly pitchy to reddish on the rest.

== Life history ==
The recorded host plants for this species are Freycinetia species. The larvae have also been described. They have six eye spots on their head.
