= Callistola tricolor =

Scientific classification
- Kingdom: Animalia
- Phylum: Arthropoda
- Clade: Pancrustacea
- Class: Insecta
- Order: Coleoptera
- Suborder: Polyphaga
- Infraorder: Cucujiformia
- Family: Chrysomelidae
- Genus: Callistola
- Species: C. tricolor

Binomial name
- Callistola tricolor Gressitt, 1963

Species of beetle

Callistola tricolor is a species of beetle of the family Chrysomelidae. It is found in south-western New Guinea.

== Description ==
Adults reach a length of about 10 mm. They are ochraceous to purplish green and black. The pronotum is orange-ochraceous with a triangular black apical area. The basal half of the elytra is ochraceous with a purplish green band. The apical one-fifth is reddish ochraceous.

== Life history ==
The recorded host plants for this species are Freycinetia species. The larvae have also been described. They are testaceous, but pale pitchy brown on most of the caudal process.
