= Callistola cyclops =

Scientific classification
- Kingdom: Animalia
- Phylum: Arthropoda
- Clade: Pancrustacea
- Class: Insecta
- Order: Coleoptera
- Suborder: Polyphaga
- Infraorder: Cucujiformia
- Family: Chrysomelidae
- Genus: Callistola
- Species: C. cyclops

Binomial name
- Callistola cyclops Gressitt, 1963

Species of beetle

Callistola cyclops is a species of beetle of the family Chrysomelidae. It is found in north-western New Guinea.

== Description ==
Adults reach a length of about 8 mm. They are testaceous to black, while the pronotum is ochraceous brown, becoming blackish anteriorly. The elytra are mostly pitchy blackish.

== Life history ==
The recorded host plants for this species are Freycinetia species.
