= Callistola bomberiana =

Scientific classification
- Kingdom: Animalia
- Phylum: Arthropoda
- Clade: Pancrustacea
- Class: Insecta
- Order: Coleoptera
- Suborder: Polyphaga
- Infraorder: Cucujiformia
- Family: Chrysomelidae
- Genus: Callistola
- Species: C. bomberiana

Binomial name
- Callistola bomberiana Gressitt, 1963

Species of beetle

Callistola bomberiana is a species of beetle of the family Chrysomelidae. It is found in north-western and south-western New Guinea.

== Description ==
Adults reach a length of about 7-8.4 mm. They are orange testaceous to pitchy black. The pronotum is orange testaceous with a median black area, while the elytra are pitchy black with a slightly greenish tinge.

== Life history ==
The recorded host plants for this species are Freycinetia species. The larvae have also been described. They have five distinct and one faint eye spot on their head.
