= Callistola masoni =

Scientific classification
- Kingdom: Animalia
- Phylum: Arthropoda
- Clade: Pancrustacea
- Class: Insecta
- Order: Coleoptera
- Suborder: Polyphaga
- Infraorder: Cucujiformia
- Family: Chrysomelidae
- Genus: Callistola
- Species: C. masoni

Binomial name
- Callistola masoni Gressitt, 1960

Species of beetle

Callistola masoni is a species of beetle of the family Chrysomelidae. It is found on the Solomon Islands (New Georgia).

== Description ==
Adults reach a length of about 7.9 mm. They are reddish to shiny black. The head is blackish above and somewhat reddish anteriorly and beneath. The antennae are bluish black. The elytra are shiny black, but somewhat pitchy on the external margin and dull reddish apically.

== Life history ==
The recorded host plants for this species are Freycinetia species.
