= Micrispa donaxiae =

Scientific classification
- Kingdom: Animalia
- Phylum: Arthropoda
- Class: Insecta
- Order: Coleoptera
- Suborder: Polyphaga
- Infraorder: Cucujiformia
- Family: Chrysomelidae
- Genus: Micrispa
- Species: M. donaxiae

Binomial name
- Micrispa donaxiae (Gressitt, 1963)

Synonyms
- Gonophora (Micrispa) donaxiae Gressitt, 1963

Species of beetle

Micrispa donaxiae is a species of beetle of the family Chrysomelidae. It is found in north-eastern and north-western New Guinea.

== Description ==
Adults reach a length of about 3.2-3.6 mm. They are pale ochraceous with the raised portions of the elytra paler testaceous and with the ventral surfaces yellowish testaceous.

The larvae have also been described. They are whitish testaceous, with the pronotum darker testaceous and the prosternum a bit darker. They reach a length of about 5.8 mm.

== Life history ==
The recorded host plants for this species are Donax cunniformis, Costus and Heliconia species.
