= Micrispa costi =

Scientific classification
- Kingdom: Animalia
- Phylum: Arthropoda
- Class: Insecta
- Order: Coleoptera
- Suborder: Polyphaga
- Infraorder: Cucujiformia
- Family: Chrysomelidae
- Genus: Micrispa
- Species: M. costi

Binomial name
- Micrispa costi (Gressitt, 1957)

Synonyms
- Gonophora costi Gressitt, 1957

Species of beetle

Micrispa costi is a species of beetle of the family Chrysomelidae. It is found on the Solomon Islands (New Britain, New Ireland).

== Life history ==
The recorded host plants for this species are Costus and Alpinia species.
