= Callistola sedlacekana =

Scientific classification
- Kingdom: Animalia
- Phylum: Arthropoda
- Clade: Pancrustacea
- Class: Insecta
- Order: Coleoptera
- Suborder: Polyphaga
- Infraorder: Cucujiformia
- Family: Chrysomelidae
- Genus: Callistola
- Species: C. sedlacekana

Binomial name
- Callistola sedlacekana Gressitt, 1963

Species of beetle

Callistola sedlacekana is a species of beetle of the family Chrysomelidae. It is found in north-western New Guinea.

== Description ==
Adults reach a length of about 8-8.8 mm. They are testaceous to black. The pronotum is orange testaceous with an apical blackish triangle. The elytra are orange testaceous on the basal three-fifth, but blackish on the remainder.

== Life history ==
The recorded host plants for this species are Freycinetia species. The larvae and pupae have also been described. The larvae have four black eye spots on their head. The pupae are testaceous but darker posteriorly.
