= Callistola angusta =

Scientific classification
- Kingdom: Animalia
- Phylum: Arthropoda
- Clade: Pancrustacea
- Class: Insecta
- Order: Coleoptera
- Suborder: Polyphaga
- Infraorder: Cucujiformia
- Family: Chrysomelidae
- Genus: Callistola
- Species: C. angusta

Binomial name
- Callistola angusta Gressitt, 1957

Species of beetle

Callistola angusta is a species of beetle of the family Chrysomelidae. It is found in New Britain.

== Life history ==
The recorded host plants for this species are Freycinetia species.
