= Callistola maai =

Scientific classification
- Kingdom: Animalia
- Phylum: Arthropoda
- Clade: Pancrustacea
- Class: Insecta
- Order: Coleoptera
- Suborder: Polyphaga
- Infraorder: Cucujiformia
- Family: Chrysomelidae
- Genus: Callistola
- Species: C. maai

Binomial name
- Callistola maai Gressitt, 1960

Species of beetle

Callistola maai is a species of beetle of the family Chrysomelidae. It is found in New Guinea.

== Description ==
Adults reach a length of about 9.5-11 mm. They are reddish to purplish and greenish black. The head is bluish black above and pale beneath and the antennae are greenish black (but partly pitchy basally. The elytra are mostly metallic (purplish anteriorly and greenish posteriorly) and pale on the basal one-fourth of the suture, the base, part of humerus and the basal part of the external margin.

== Life history ==
The recorded host plants for this species are Pandanus species.
