= Callistola subvirida =

Scientific classification
- Kingdom: Animalia
- Phylum: Arthropoda
- Clade: Pancrustacea
- Class: Insecta
- Order: Coleoptera
- Suborder: Polyphaga
- Infraorder: Cucujiformia
- Family: Chrysomelidae
- Genus: Callistola
- Species: C. subvirida

Binomial name
- Callistola subvirida Gressitt, 1963

Species of beetle

Callistola subvirida is a species of beetle of the family Chrysomelidae. It is found in north-western New Guinea.

== Description ==
Adults reach a length of about 9.5-11 mm. They are orange testaceous to steel blue, metallic green and black.

== Life history ==
The recorded host plants for this species are Freycinetia species. The larvae have also been described. They are testaceous. The head with six pigmented eye spots.
