= Micrispa scleriae =

Scientific classification
- Kingdom: Animalia
- Phylum: Arthropoda
- Class: Insecta
- Order: Coleoptera
- Suborder: Polyphaga
- Infraorder: Cucujiformia
- Family: Chrysomelidae
- Genus: Micrispa
- Species: M. scleriae

Binomial name
- Micrispa scleriae (Gressitt, 1963)

Synonyms
- Gonophora (Micrispa) scleriae Gressitt, 1963

Species of beetle

Micrispa scleriae is a species of beetle of the family Chrysomelidae. It is found in south-western New Guinea.

== Description ==
Adults reach a length of about 2.8–2.8 mm. They are whitish testaceous to pitchy black, while the pronotum is pale testaceous with a small pitchy spot. The elytra are testaceous, each with three incomplete pitchy black bands.

The larvae have also been described. They are whitish testaceous (but slightly less whitish on the pronotum) and reddish on the anterior portion of the head capsule. They reach a length of about 4.3 mm.

== Life history ==
The host plants for this species are thought to be Scleria species.
