= Callistola =

Scientific classification
- Kingdom: Animalia
- Phylum: Arthropoda
- Clade: Pancrustacea
- Class: Insecta
- Order: Coleoptera
- Suborder: Polyphaga
- Infraorder: Cucujiformia
- Family: Chrysomelidae
- Subfamily: Cassidinae
- Tribe: Cryptonychini
- Genus: Callistola; Dejean, 1836

Type species
- Hispa speciosa Boisduval, 1835

Subgenera
- Callistola (Callistola) Guérin-Méneville, 1840; Callistola (Freycinetivora) Gressitt, 1957

Diversity
- 43 species, see text

Synonyms
- Oxycephala Chapuis, 1875 (not Guérin-Méneville); Plesispa (Plesispella) Chûjô, 1943

Genus of beetles

Callistola is a genus of leaf beetles in the tribe Cryptonychini. Species in this genus are found in the Pacific region, with a large number of species known from New Guinea.

== Species ==
This genus includes the following species:

=== Subgenus Callistola Guérin-Méneville, 1840 ===
- Callistola angusta Gressitt, 1957
- Callistola bella Gressitt, 1960
- Callistola bruijnii (Gestro, 1885)
- Callistola dilutipes (Weise, 1905)
- Callistola esakii (Chûjô, 1943)
- Callistola fordi Gressitt, 1957
- Callistola grossa (Maulik, 1936)
- Callistola maai Gressitt, 1960
- Callistola major Gressitt, 1957
- Callistola misolensis (Spaeth, 1936)
- Callistola montana Gressitt, 1960
- Callistola omalleyi Gressitt, 1960
- Callistola pandani (Gressitt, 1955)
- Callistola pandenella Gressitt, 1960
- Callistola papuensis Gressitt, 1957
- Callistola pulchra Gressitt, 1957
- Callistola puncticollis (Spaeth, 1936)
- Callistola spaethi (Chûjô, 1943)
- Callistola speciosa (Boisduval, 1835)
- Callistola swartensis Gressitt, 1960
- Callistola szentivanyi Gressitt, 1960
- Callistola tripartita (Fairmaire, 1883)
- Callistola uhmanni Gressitt, 1960
- Callistola zonalis Gressitt, 1960

=== Subgenus Freycinetivora Gressitt, 1957 ===
- Callistola dimidiata Gressitt, 1960
- Callistola freycinetiae Gressitt, 1957
- Callistola masoni Gressitt, 1960
- Callistola varicolor Gressitt, 1957
- Callistola wrighti Gressitt, 1960

=== Unplaced species ===
- Callistola attenuata Gressitt, 1963
- Callistola boisduvali (Weise, 1908)
- Callistola bomberiana Gressitt, 1963
- Callistola corporaali (Uhmann, 1932)
- Callistola cyclops Gressitt, 1963
- Callistola devastator Gressitt, 1960
- Callistola elegans Gressitt, 1960
- Callistola freycinetella Gressitt, 1963
- Callistola margaretae Gressitt, 1963
- Callistola metselaari Gressitt, 1960
- Callistola ruficollis (Spaeth, 1936)
- Callistola sedlacekana Gressitt, 1963
- Callistola subvirida Gressitt, 1963
- Callistola tricolor Gressitt, 1963
