= Dactylispa longispina =

Scientific classification
- Kingdom: Animalia
- Phylum: Arthropoda
- Class: Insecta
- Order: Coleoptera
- Suborder: Polyphaga
- Infraorder: Cucujiformia
- Family: Chrysomelidae
- Genus: Dactylispa
- Species: D. longispina

Binomial name
- Dactylispa longispina Gressitt, 1938

Species of beetle

Dactylispa longispina is a species of beetle of the family Chrysomelidae. It is found in China (Fujian, Guangxi, Hainan, Hubei, Guangdong, Yunnan), Thailand and Vietnam.

== Life history ==
No host plant has been documented for this species.
