= Callistola wrighti =

Scientific classification
- Kingdom: Animalia
- Phylum: Arthropoda
- Clade: Pancrustacea
- Class: Insecta
- Order: Coleoptera
- Suborder: Polyphaga
- Infraorder: Cucujiformia
- Family: Chrysomelidae
- Genus: Callistola
- Species: C. wrighti

Binomial name
- Callistola wrighti Gressitt, 1960

Species of beetle

Callistola wrighti is a species of beetle of the family Chrysomelidae. It is found on the Solomon Islands (Kolombangara).

== Description ==
Adults reach a length of about 6.6 mm. They are bright red to pitchy black. The head is pale and segments 1-2 of the antennae are red, while the rest is pitchy black. The elytra have a pitchy black band.

== Life history ==
The recorded host plants for this species are Freycinetia species.
