= Micrispa zingiberaceae =

Scientific classification
- Kingdom: Animalia
- Phylum: Arthropoda
- Class: Insecta
- Order: Coleoptera
- Suborder: Polyphaga
- Infraorder: Cucujiformia
- Family: Chrysomelidae
- Genus: Micrispa
- Species: M. zingiberaceae

Binomial name
- Micrispa zingiberaceae (Gressitt, 1963)

Synonyms
- Gonophora (Micrispa) zingiberaceae Gressitt, 1963

Species of beetle

Micrispa zingiberaceae is a species of beetle of the family Chrysomelidae. It is found in north-eastern New Guinea.

== Description ==
Adults reach a length of about 3.5–4.2 mm. They are pale testaceous to pitchy black, while the pronotum is pale testaceous with a pitchy median band in the basal area. The elytra are dull testaceous to pale brown with darker brown and pitchy black portions.

The larvae have also been described. They are creamy whitish with an ochraceous pronotum, while the prosternum is nearly reddish brown on the central portion and on the head capsule.

== Life history ==
The recorded host plants for this species are gingers (Zingiberaceae).
