= Trigonoptera muruana =

Scientific classification
- Kingdom: Animalia
- Phylum: Arthropoda
- Clade: Pancrustacea
- Class: Insecta
- Order: Coleoptera
- Suborder: Polyphaga
- Infraorder: Cucujiformia
- Family: Cerambycidae
- Genus: Trigonoptera
- Species: T. muruana

Binomial name
- Trigonoptera muruana Gressitt, 1984

Species of beetle

Trigonoptera muruana is a species of beetle in the family Cerambycidae. It was described by Judson Linsley Gressitt in 1984. The holotype of the species was collected near Kulumadau Hill on Woodlark Island (Murua), Papua New Guinea.
