= Micrispa cubicularis =

Scientific classification
- Kingdom: Animalia
- Phylum: Arthropoda
- Class: Insecta
- Order: Coleoptera
- Suborder: Polyphaga
- Infraorder: Cucujiformia
- Family: Chrysomelidae
- Genus: Micrispa
- Species: M. cubicularis

Binomial name
- Micrispa cubicularis (Gressitt, 1963)

Synonyms
- Gonophora (Micrispa) cubicularis Gressitt, 1963

Species of beetle

Micrispa cubicularis is a species of beetle of the family Chrysomelidae. It is found in south-western New Guinea.

== Description ==
Adults reach a length of about 3.1 mm. They are orange ochraceous to pitchy black, while the head is dull orange and the pronotum is pitchy reddish. The elytra are pitchy black with reddish orange costae and transverse ridges.

== Life history ==
The host plants for this species are thought to be Alpinia species.
