= Dactylispa superspinosa =

Scientific classification
- Kingdom: Animalia
- Phylum: Arthropoda
- Class: Insecta
- Order: Coleoptera
- Suborder: Polyphaga
- Infraorder: Cucujiformia
- Family: Chrysomelidae
- Genus: Dactylispa
- Species: D. superspinosa

Binomial name
- Dactylispa superspinosa Gressitt & Kimoto, 1963

Species of beetle

Dactylispa superspinosa is a species of beetle of the family Chrysomelidae. It is found in China (Hubei, Sichuan).

== Description ==
Adults reach a length of about 4.6 mm. They are mostly shiny black above with a slight pitchy tinge. The apex of the elytra (including most of the apical spines) is ochraceous.

== Life history ==
No host plant has been documented for this species.
