= Callistola omalleyi =

Scientific classification
- Kingdom: Animalia
- Phylum: Arthropoda
- Clade: Pancrustacea
- Class: Insecta
- Order: Coleoptera
- Suborder: Polyphaga
- Infraorder: Cucujiformia
- Family: Chrysomelidae
- Genus: Callistola
- Species: C. omalleyi

Binomial name
- Callistola omalleyi Gressitt, 1960

Species of beetle

Callistola omalleyi is a species of beetle of the family Chrysomelidae. It is found on the Admiralty Islands.

== Description ==
Adults reach a length of about 12.6 mm. They are reddish to blackish green. The head is pitchy in the middle area, while the rest is pale. The antennae are greenish black. The elytra are blackish green tinged with blue or purplish and with the base, humeral area, and suture pale.

== Life history ==
The recorded host plants for this species are Pandanus species.
