= Micrispa musae =

Scientific classification
- Kingdom: Animalia
- Phylum: Arthropoda
- Class: Insecta
- Order: Coleoptera
- Suborder: Polyphaga
- Infraorder: Cucujiformia
- Family: Chrysomelidae
- Genus: Micrispa
- Species: M. musae

Binomial name
- Micrispa musae (Gressitt, 1963)

Synonyms
- Gonophora (Micrispa) musae Gressitt, 1963

Species of beetle

Micrispa musae is a species of beetle of the family Chrysomelidae. It is found in south-western and north-western New Guinea.

== Description ==
Adults reach a length of about 3.3-3.8 mm. They are ochraceous to pitchy black, while the head is reddish and the elytra are reddish brown with the apical margin testaceous and most of the disc pitchy black with orange to reddish brown portions.

== Life history ==
The recorded host plants for this species are Musa and Costus species.
