= Dactylispa approximata =

Scientific classification
- Kingdom: Animalia
- Phylum: Arthropoda
- Class: Insecta
- Order: Coleoptera
- Suborder: Polyphaga
- Infraorder: Cucujiformia
- Family: Chrysomelidae
- Genus: Dactylispa
- Species: D. approximata

Binomial name
- Dactylispa approximata Gressitt, 1939

Species of beetle

Dactylispa approximata is a species of beetle of the family Chrysomelidae. It is found in China (Fujian, Guangdong, Guangxi, Sichuan, Xizang).

== Life history ==
The recorded host plants for this species are grasses, including Lophatherum gracile.
