= Callistola uhmanni =

Scientific classification
- Kingdom: Animalia
- Phylum: Arthropoda
- Clade: Pancrustacea
- Class: Insecta
- Order: Coleoptera
- Suborder: Polyphaga
- Infraorder: Cucujiformia
- Family: Chrysomelidae
- Genus: Callistola
- Species: C. uhmanni

Binomial name
- Callistola uhmanni Gressitt, 1960

Species of beetle

Callistola uhmanni is a species of beetle of the family Chrysomelidae. It is found in New Guinea.

== Description ==
Adults reach a length of about 12-14 mm. They are reddish to greenish black. The head is blackish above and pale beneath and the antennae are mostly black. The anterior one-third of the elytra is pale, while the rest is greenish black.

== Life history ==
The recorded host plants for this species are Pandanus species.
