= Trigonoptera harlequina =

Scientific classification
- Domain: Eukaryota
- Kingdom: Animalia
- Phylum: Arthropoda
- Class: Insecta
- Order: Coleoptera
- Suborder: Polyphaga
- Infraorder: Cucujiformia
- Family: Cerambycidae
- Genus: Trigonoptera
- Species: T. harlequina

Binomial name
- Trigonoptera harlequina Gressitt, 1984

Species of beetle

Trigonoptera harlequina is a species of beetle in the family Cerambycidae. It was described by Judson Linsley Gressitt in 1984.
