= Micrispa cyperaceae =

Scientific classification
- Kingdom: Animalia
- Phylum: Arthropoda
- Class: Insecta
- Order: Coleoptera
- Suborder: Polyphaga
- Infraorder: Cucujiformia
- Family: Chrysomelidae
- Genus: Micrispa
- Species: M. cyperaceae

Binomial name
- Micrispa cyperaceae (Gressitt, 1960)

Synonyms
- Gonophora cyperaceae Gressitt, 1957

Species of beetle

Micrispa cyperaceae is a species of beetle of the family Chrysomelidae. It is found on the Admiralty Islands.

== Life history ==
The recorded host plant for this species is an unidentified small sedge (Cyperaceae).
