= Callistola szentivanyi =

Scientific classification
- Kingdom: Animalia
- Phylum: Arthropoda
- Clade: Pancrustacea
- Class: Insecta
- Order: Coleoptera
- Suborder: Polyphaga
- Infraorder: Cucujiformia
- Family: Chrysomelidae
- Genus: Callistola
- Species: C. szentivanyi

Binomial name
- Callistola szentivanyi Gressitt, 1960

Synonyms
- Callistola szentwanyi

Species of beetle

Callistola szentivanyi is a species of beetle of the family Chrysomelidae. It is found in New Guinea.

== Description ==
Adults reach a length of about 12.6 mm. They are reddish to greenish blue. The head is purplish black above and pale beneath and the antennae are bluish black. The elytra are pale with a metallic band. This band is purplish anteriorly and greenish posteriorly.

== Life history ==
The recorded host plants for this species are Freycinetia and Pandanus species.
