= Callistola metselaari =

Scientific classification
- Kingdom: Animalia
- Phylum: Arthropoda
- Clade: Pancrustacea
- Class: Insecta
- Order: Coleoptera
- Suborder: Polyphaga
- Infraorder: Cucujiformia
- Family: Chrysomelidae
- Genus: Callistola
- Species: C. metselaari

Binomial name
- Callistola metselaari Gressitt, 1960

Synonyms
- Callistola melselaari

Species of beetle

Callistola metselaari is a species of beetle of the family Chrysomelidae. It is found in New Guinea.

== Description ==
Adults reach a length of about 10.8 mm. They are reddish to steel blue. The head is bluish black above and pale beneath. The antennae are also bluish black, but slightly reddish near the base. The elytra are pale with a broad purplish to steely blue band.

== Life history ==
The recorded host plants for this species are Freycinetia species.
