= Callistola zonalis =

Scientific classification
- Kingdom: Animalia
- Phylum: Arthropoda
- Clade: Pancrustacea
- Class: Insecta
- Order: Coleoptera
- Suborder: Polyphaga
- Infraorder: Cucujiformia
- Family: Chrysomelidae
- Genus: Callistola
- Species: C. zonalis

Binomial name
- Callistola zonalis Gressitt, 1960

Species of beetle

Callistola zonalis is a species of beetle of the family Chrysomelidae. It is found in New Guinea.

== Description ==
Adults reach a length of about 10.3 mm. They are reddish ochraceous with steel blue bands. The head is greenish black above and pale on the underside. The antennae are black with bluish on segments 3–11. The elytra are steel to purplish blue with the base pale and with a pale band.

== Life history ==
The recorded host plants for this species are Freycinetia species.
