= Callistola dimidiata =

Scientific classification
- Kingdom: Animalia
- Phylum: Arthropoda
- Clade: Pancrustacea
- Class: Insecta
- Order: Coleoptera
- Suborder: Polyphaga
- Infraorder: Cucujiformia
- Family: Chrysomelidae
- Genus: Callistola
- Species: C. dimidiata

Binomial name
- Callistola dimidiata Gressitt, 1960

Species of beetle

Callistola dimidiata is a species of beetle of the family Chrysomelidae. It is found on the Solomon Islands (Malaita).

== Description ==
Adults reach a length of about 8.35 mm. They are reddish ochraceous with the posterior two-thirds of the elytra bluish black, becoming pitchy red on the posterior margins. The antennae are reddish basally and at the apex, while the rest is pitchy black.

== Life history ==
The recorded host plants for this species are Freycinetia species.
