= Callistola margaretae =

Scientific classification
- Kingdom: Animalia
- Phylum: Arthropoda
- Clade: Pancrustacea
- Class: Insecta
- Order: Coleoptera
- Suborder: Polyphaga
- Infraorder: Cucujiformia
- Family: Chrysomelidae
- Genus: Callistola
- Species: C. margaretae

Binomial name
- Callistola margaretae Gressitt, 1963

Species of beetle

Callistola margaretae is a species of beetle of the family Chrysomelidae. It is found in New Guinea.

== Description ==
Adults reach a length of about 7.4-8.4 mm. They are orange testaceous to purplish black. The basal one-third of the elytra is purplish to greenish black, orange testaceous in the middle and purplish black on the apical one-third.

== Life history ==
The recorded host plants for this species are Freycinetia species. The larvae and pupae have also been described. The larvae are yellow testaceous with five pigmented eye spots on the head.
