= Callistola elegans =

Scientific classification
- Kingdom: Animalia
- Phylum: Arthropoda
- Clade: Pancrustacea
- Class: Insecta
- Order: Coleoptera
- Suborder: Polyphaga
- Infraorder: Cucujiformia
- Family: Chrysomelidae
- Genus: Callistola
- Species: C. elegans

Binomial name
- Callistola elegans Gressitt, 1960

Species of beetle

Callistola elegans is a species of tortoise and leaf-mining beetles in the tribe Cryptonychini. It is found in south-western and north-western New Guinea.

== Description ==
Adults reach a length of about 16 mm. They are golden yellow to pitchy or greenish. The head is shiny black above and pale beneath and the antennae are bluish black. The elytra are yellow, each with two metallic green bands.

== Life history ==
The recorded host plants for this species are Pandanus species. Both the larvae and pupae have been described. The larvae are testaceous, slightly tinged with brownish on parts of the caudal process. The pupae are dull testaceous, but darker on the cephalic processes.
