= Callistola bella =

Scientific classification
- Kingdom: Animalia
- Phylum: Arthropoda
- Clade: Pancrustacea
- Class: Insecta
- Order: Coleoptera
- Suborder: Polyphaga
- Infraorder: Cucujiformia
- Family: Chrysomelidae
- Genus: Callistola
- Species: C. bella

Binomial name
- Callistola bella Gressitt, 1960

Species of beetle

Callistola bella is a species of beetle of the family Chrysomelidae. It is found in New Guinea.

== Description ==
Adults reach a length of about 12.3 mm. They are reddish to purplish blue. The head is bluish black above and pale beneath and the antennae are bluish black. The elytra are steel blue on basal four-fifths, varying to purplish and green with the apex reddish.

== Life history ==
The recorded host plants for this species are Freycinetia species.
