= Callistola swartensis =

Scientific classification
- Kingdom: Animalia
- Phylum: Arthropoda
- Clade: Pancrustacea
- Class: Insecta
- Order: Coleoptera
- Suborder: Polyphaga
- Infraorder: Cucujiformia
- Family: Chrysomelidae
- Genus: Callistola
- Species: C. swartensis

Binomial name
- Callistola swartensis Gressitt, 1960

Species of beetle

Callistola swartensis is a species of beetle of the family Chrysomelidae. It is found in New Guinea.

== Description ==
Adults reach a length of about 12.6 mm. They are reddish to bluish black. The head is blackish above and pale beneath, while the antennae are bluish black (but pitchy reddish on segment 2 and the apex of segment 1). The elytra are pale, but the apical two-fifths are pitchy black and the external margin is brownish.

== Life history ==
The recorded host plants for this species are Freycinetia species.
