= Callistola devastator =

Scientific classification
- Kingdom: Animalia
- Phylum: Arthropoda
- Clade: Pancrustacea
- Class: Insecta
- Order: Coleoptera
- Suborder: Polyphaga
- Infraorder: Cucujiformia
- Family: Chrysomelidae
- Genus: Callistola
- Species: C. devastator

Binomial name
- Callistola devastator Gressitt, 1960

Species of beetle

Callistola devastator is a species of beetle of the family Chrysomelidae. It is found in New Guinea.

== Description ==
Adults reach a length of about 15.2 mm. They are reddish to pitchy black and metallic green. The head is bluish black above and the antennae are bluish black. The basal half, extreme apex and apical one-fifth of the external margin of the elytra is pale, while the remainder is metallic green.

== Life history ==
The recorded host plants for this species are Pandanus species. No host plant has been documented for this species.
