= Sphigmothorax tricinctus =

Scientific classification
- Kingdom: Animalia
- Phylum: Arthropoda
- Class: Insecta
- Order: Coleoptera
- Suborder: Polyphaga
- Infraorder: Cucujiformia
- Family: Cerambycidae
- Genus: Sphigmothorax
- Species: S. tricinctus

Binomial name
- Sphigmothorax tricinctus Gressitt, 1951

Species of beetle

Sphigmothorax tricinctus is a species of beetle in the family Cerambycidae. It was described by Gressitt in 1951.
