= Micrispa biakana =

Scientific classification
- Kingdom: Animalia
- Phylum: Arthropoda
- Class: Insecta
- Order: Coleoptera
- Suborder: Polyphaga
- Infraorder: Cucujiformia
- Family: Chrysomelidae
- Genus: Micrispa
- Species: M. biakana

Binomial name
- Micrispa biakana (Gressitt, 1963)

Synonyms
- Gonophora (Micrispa) biakana Gressitt, 1963

Species of beetle

Micrispa biakana is a species of beetle of the family Chrysomelidae. It is found in north-western New Guinea (Biak).

== Description ==
Adults reach a length of about 4.7 mm. The head, antennae and pronotum are pale orange ochraceous. The elytra have a brownish outer margin, a pale ochraceous apical margin and the disc is mostly pitchy black.

== Life history ==
The host plants for this species are possibly Alpinia species.
