= Callistola montana =

Scientific classification
- Kingdom: Animalia
- Phylum: Arthropoda
- Clade: Pancrustacea
- Class: Insecta
- Order: Coleoptera
- Suborder: Polyphaga
- Infraorder: Cucujiformia
- Family: Chrysomelidae
- Genus: Callistola
- Species: C. montana

Binomial name
- Callistola montana Gressitt, 1960

Species of beetle

Callistola montana is a species of beetle of the family Chrysomelidae. It is found in Papua New Guinea.

== Description ==
Adults reach a length of about 15.5 mm. They are steel blue to black and testaceous. The head is black above and dark pale on the underside. The antennae are bluish black. The elytra are steel blue with a pale band. The apex is dark reddish.

== Life history ==
The recorded host plants for this species are Pandanus species.
