= Micrispa puncticollis =

Scientific classification
- Kingdom: Animalia
- Phylum: Arthropoda
- Clade: Pancrustacea
- Class: Insecta
- Order: Coleoptera
- Suborder: Polyphaga
- Infraorder: Cucujiformia
- Family: Chrysomelidae
- Genus: Micrispa
- Species: M. puncticollis

Binomial name
- Micrispa puncticollis (Gressitt, 1963)

Synonyms
- Gonophora (Micrispa) puncticollis Gressitt, 1963

Species of beetle

Micrispa puncticollis is a species of beetle of the family Chrysomelidae. It is found in north-eastern New Guinea.

== Description ==
Adults reach a length of about 3.4 mm. They are testaceous to pitchy black, while the head is dull pitchy above and reddish beneath. The pronotum is pitchy black, with reddish on each side of the anterior portion, at anterior angle and near the basal angle. The elytra are pitchy to blackish, with some testaceous at the base and with the basal one-fourth reddish brown and the external margin brown to pitchy brown.

== Life history ==
The recorded host plants for this species are Alpinia species.
