= Micrispa maai =

Scientific classification
- Kingdom: Animalia
- Phylum: Arthropoda
- Class: Insecta
- Order: Coleoptera
- Suborder: Polyphaga
- Infraorder: Cucujiformia
- Family: Chrysomelidae
- Genus: Micrispa
- Species: M. maai

Binomial name
- Micrispa maai (Gressitt, 1963)

Synonyms
- Gonophora (Micrispa) maai Gressitt, 1963

Species of beetle

Micrispa maai is a species of beetle of the family Chrysomelidae. It is found in south-western and north-western New Guinea.

== Description ==
Adults reach a length of about 3.6 mm. The head, antennae and prothorax are pale orange ochraceous, while the scutellum is pitchy brownish. The elytra are mostly pitchy, palest on the apical margin and reddish on the first costa and in the basal one-fourth, at the middle, and before the apex, as well as on the second and third costa 2 and 3.

== Life history ==
The recorded host plants for this species are Alpinia species.
