= Dactylispa discalis =

Scientific classification
- Kingdom: Animalia
- Phylum: Arthropoda
- Class: Insecta
- Order: Coleoptera
- Suborder: Polyphaga
- Infraorder: Cucujiformia
- Family: Chrysomelidae
- Genus: Dactylispa
- Species: D. discalis

Binomial name
- Dactylispa discalis Gressitt, 1963

Species of beetle

Dactylispa discalis is a species of beetle of the family Chrysomelidae. It is found in north-eastern and possibly south-eastern New Guinea.

== Description ==
Adults reach a length of about 3.6-4.3 mm. They are pale orange ochraceous. The elytral disc (except for the base, humerus and apex) is pitchy black.

== Life history ==
The host plant for this species is an unidentified large-leafed shrub.
