= Callistola freycinetiae =

Scientific classification
- Kingdom: Animalia
- Phylum: Arthropoda
- Clade: Pancrustacea
- Class: Insecta
- Order: Coleoptera
- Suborder: Polyphaga
- Infraorder: Cucujiformia
- Family: Chrysomelidae
- Genus: Callistola
- Species: C. freycinetiae

Binomial name
- Callistola freycinetiae Gressitt, 1957

Species of beetle

Callistola freycinetiae is a species of beetle of the family Chrysomelidae. It is found in New Caledonia.

== Life history ==
The recorded host plants for this species are Freycinetia and Ptychosperma species.
