= Micrispa pellucida =

Scientific classification
- Kingdom: Animalia
- Phylum: Arthropoda
- Class: Insecta
- Order: Coleoptera
- Suborder: Polyphaga
- Infraorder: Cucujiformia
- Family: Chrysomelidae
- Genus: Micrispa
- Species: M. pellucida

Binomial name
- Micrispa pellucida (Gressitt, 1957)

Synonyms
- Gonophora pellucida Gressitt, 1957

Species of beetle

Micrispa pellucida is a species of beetle of the family Chrysomelidae. It is found in New Guinea.

== Life history ==
The recorded host plants for this species are Alpinia species.
