= Dactylispa minor =

Scientific classification
- Kingdom: Animalia
- Phylum: Arthropoda
- Class: Insecta
- Order: Coleoptera
- Suborder: Polyphaga
- Infraorder: Cucujiformia
- Family: Chrysomelidae
- Genus: Dactylispa
- Species: D. minor

Binomial name
- Dactylispa minor Gressitt, 1963

Species of beetle

Dactylispa minor is a species of beetle of the family Chrysomelidae. It is found in south-western and possibly north-western New Guinea.

== Description ==
Adults reach a length of about 3.2 mm. The head, antennae, prothorax and scutellum are pale yellowish testaceous, while the elytra are reddish ochraceous (but the inner portion of the disc is partly pitchy).

== Life history ==
No host plant has been documented for this species.
