= Micrispa semiviridis =

Scientific classification
- Kingdom: Animalia
- Phylum: Arthropoda
- Class: Insecta
- Order: Coleoptera
- Suborder: Polyphaga
- Infraorder: Cucujiformia
- Family: Chrysomelidae
- Genus: Micrispa
- Species: M. semiviridis

Binomial name
- Micrispa semiviridis (Gressitt, 1963)

Synonyms
- Gonophora (Micrispa) semiviridis Gressitt, 1963

Species of beetle

Micrispa semiviridis is a species of beetle of the family Chrysomelidae. It is found in south-western New Guinea.

== Description ==
Adults reach a length of about 2.1-2.9 mm. They are testaceous to brown and green, with the head yellowish testaceous. The pronotum is mostly pale green, with a testaceous anterior border. The upper portion of the disc on the elytra is green, while the sides and apex are reddish testaceous.

The larvae have also been described. They are whitish testaceous, but slightly yellowish on the pronotum and head capsule (which is reddish anteriorly). They reach a length of about 2 mm.

== Life history ==
The recorded host plants for this species are Alpinia species.
