= Callistola pandenella =

Scientific classification
- Kingdom: Animalia
- Phylum: Arthropoda
- Clade: Pancrustacea
- Class: Insecta
- Order: Coleoptera
- Suborder: Polyphaga
- Infraorder: Cucujiformia
- Family: Chrysomelidae
- Genus: Callistola
- Species: C. pandenella

Binomial name
- Callistola pandenella Gressitt, 1960

Species of beetle

Callistola pandenella is a species of beetle of the family Chrysomelidae. It is found in New Guinea.

== Description ==
Adults reach a length of about 7.95 mm. They are pinkish red to metallic bluish black. The head is black (tinged with greenish) above and pale beneath and the antennae are partly blackish and partly reddish to pitchy. The elytra are red with a bluish black band with greenish or purplish reflections.

== Life history ==
The recorded host plants for this species are Pandanus species.
