= Trigonoptera sulcata =

Scientific classification
- Domain: Eukaryota
- Kingdom: Animalia
- Phylum: Arthropoda
- Class: Insecta
- Order: Coleoptera
- Suborder: Polyphaga
- Infraorder: Cucujiformia
- Family: Cerambycidae
- Genus: Trigonoptera
- Species: T. sulcata

Binomial name
- Trigonoptera sulcata Aurivillius, 1924

Species of beetle

Trigonoptera sulcata is a species of beetle in the family Cerambycidae. It was described by Per Olof Christopher Aurivillius in 1924.

== Subspecies ==
- Trigonoptera sulcata sulcata Aurivillius, 1924
- Trigonoptera sulcata reversa Gilmour, 1950
