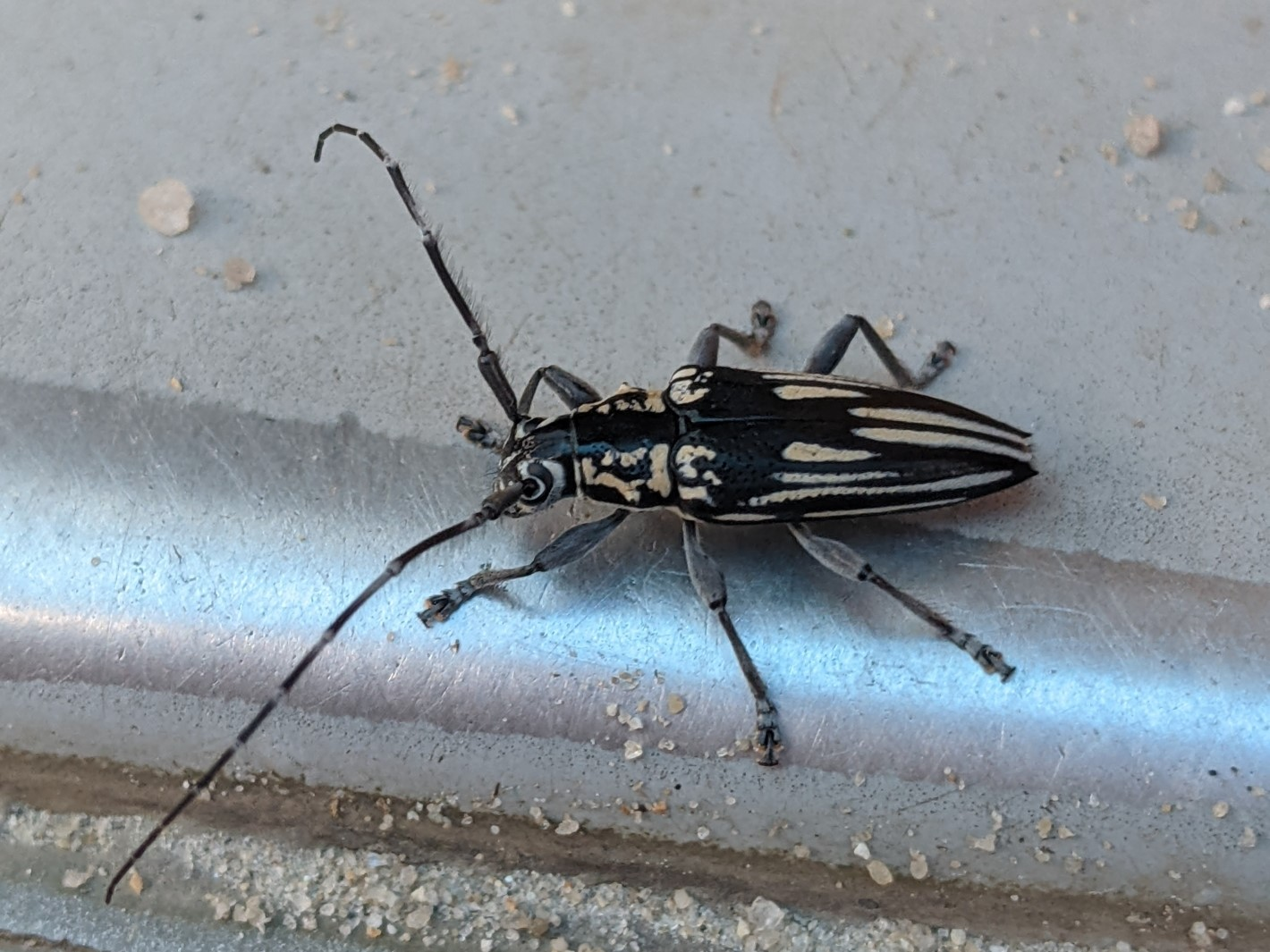

Scientific classification
- Domain: Eukaryota
- Kingdom: Animalia
- Phylum: Arthropoda
- Class: Insecta
- Order: Coleoptera
- Suborder: Polyphaga
- Infraorder: Cucujiformia
- Family: Cerambycidae
- Genus: Trigonoptera
- Species: T. vittata

Binomial name
- Trigonoptera vittata Gestro, 1876

= Trigonoptera vittata =

Species of beetle

Trigonoptera vittata is a species of beetle in the family Cerambycidae. It was described by Gestro in 1876. It is known from Australia.
