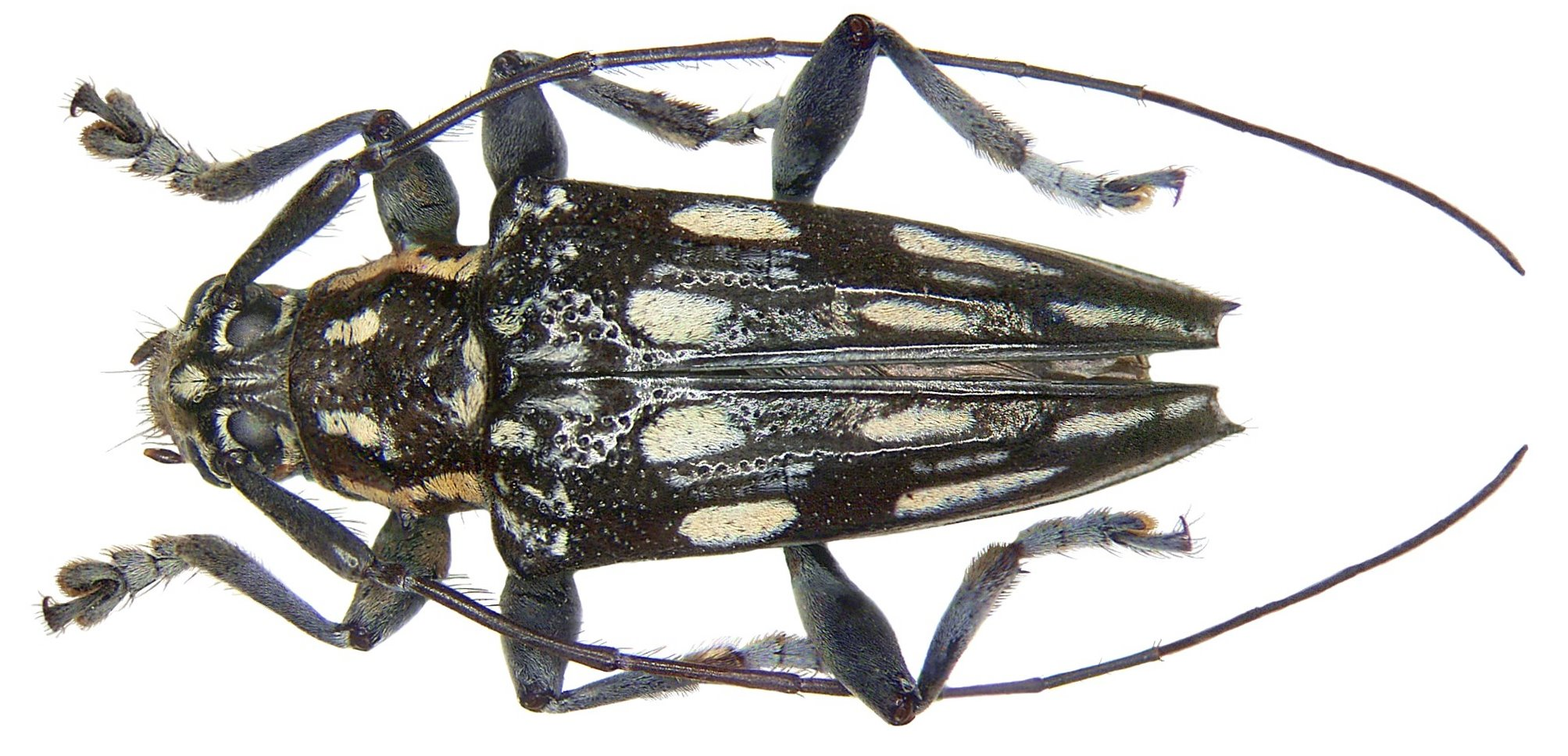

Scientific classification
- Domain: Eukaryota
- Kingdom: Animalia
- Phylum: Arthropoda
- Class: Insecta
- Order: Coleoptera
- Suborder: Polyphaga
- Infraorder: Cucujiformia
- Family: Cerambycidae
- Genus: Trigonoptera
- Species: T. maculata

Binomial name
- Trigonoptera maculata Perroud, 1855

Synonyms
- Arsysia maculata (Perroud, 1855)

= Trigonoptera maculata =

Species of beetle

Trigonoptera maculata is a species of beetle in the family Cerambycidae. It was described by Perroud in 1855. It is known from Indonesia.
