= Trigonoptera sordida =

Scientific classification
- Kingdom: Animalia
- Phylum: Arthropoda
- Class: Insecta
- Order: Coleoptera
- Suborder: Polyphaga
- Infraorder: Cucujiformia
- Family: Cerambycidae
- Genus: Trigonoptera
- Species: T. sordida

Binomial name
- Trigonoptera sordida (Pascoe, 1867)

Synonyms
- Trigonoptera papuana Gestro, 1876

Species of beetle

Trigonoptera sordida is a species of beetle in the family Cerambycidae. It was described by Francis Polkinghorne Pascoe in 1867.
