= Trigonoptera transversefasciata =

Scientific classification
- Domain: Eukaryota
- Kingdom: Animalia
- Phylum: Arthropoda
- Class: Insecta
- Order: Coleoptera
- Suborder: Polyphaga
- Infraorder: Cucujiformia
- Family: Cerambycidae
- Genus: Trigonoptera
- Species: T. transversefasciata

Binomial name
- Trigonoptera transversefasciata Gilmour, 1949

Species of beetle

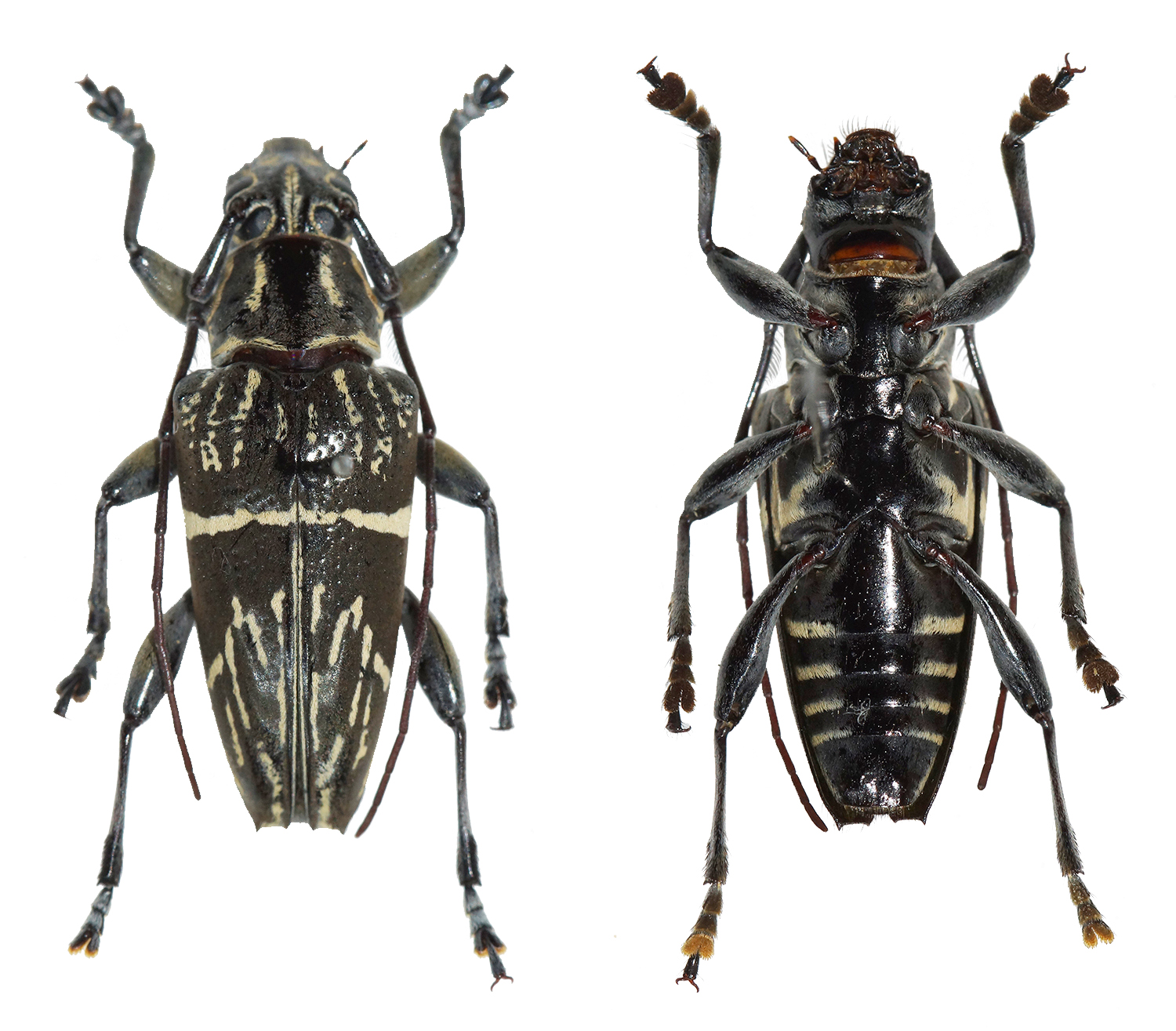

Trigonoptera transversefasciata is a species of beetle in the family Cerambycidae. It was described by E. Forrest Gilmour in 1949. It is known from Indonesia, and possibly Papua New Guinea.
