= Micrispa dentatithorax =

Scientific classification
- Kingdom: Animalia
- Phylum: Arthropoda
- Class: Insecta
- Order: Coleoptera
- Suborder: Polyphaga
- Infraorder: Cucujiformia
- Family: Chrysomelidae
- Genus: Micrispa
- Species: M. dentatithorax

Binomial name
- Micrispa dentatithorax (Pic, 1924)

Synonyms
- Gonophora dentatithorax Pic, 1924; Gonophora (Micrispa) yunnanica Chen & Sun, 1962

Species of beetle

Micrispa dentatithorax is a species of beetle of the family Chrysomelidae. It is found in China (Yunnan), Laos, Thailand and Vietnam.

== Life history ==
No host plant has been documented for this species.
