= Trigonoptera neja =

Scientific classification
- Domain: Eukaryota
- Kingdom: Animalia
- Phylum: Arthropoda
- Class: Insecta
- Order: Coleoptera
- Suborder: Polyphaga
- Infraorder: Cucujiformia
- Family: Cerambycidae
- Genus: Trigonoptera
- Species: T. neja

Binomial name
- Trigonoptera neja Gilmour, 1950

Species of beetle

Trigonoptera neja is a species of beetle in the family Cerambycidae. It was described by E. Forrest Gilmour in 1950.
