= Sphigmothorax rondoni =

Scientific classification
- Kingdom: Animalia
- Phylum: Arthropoda
- Class: Insecta
- Order: Coleoptera
- Suborder: Polyphaga
- Infraorder: Cucujiformia
- Family: Cerambycidae
- Genus: Sphigmothorax
- Species: S. rondoni

Binomial name
- Sphigmothorax rondoni (Breuning, 1965)

Species of beetle

Sphigmothorax rondoni is a species of beetle in the family Cerambycidae. It was described by Stephan von Breuning in 1965.
