= Micrispa semifusca =

Scientific classification
- Kingdom: Animalia
- Phylum: Arthropoda
- Class: Insecta
- Order: Coleoptera
- Suborder: Polyphaga
- Infraorder: Cucujiformia
- Family: Chrysomelidae
- Genus: Micrispa
- Species: M. semifusca

Binomial name
- Micrispa semifusca (Gestro, 1899)

Synonyms
- Gonophora semifusca Gestro, 1899

Species of beetle

Micrispa semifusca is a species of beetle of the family Chrysomelidae. It is found on Borneo.

== Life history ==
No host plant has been documented for this species.
