= Callistola spaethi =

Scientific classification
- Kingdom: Animalia
- Phylum: Arthropoda
- Clade: Pancrustacea
- Class: Insecta
- Order: Coleoptera
- Suborder: Polyphaga
- Infraorder: Cucujiformia
- Family: Chrysomelidae
- Genus: Callistola
- Species: C. spaethi

Binomial name
- Callistola spaethi (Chûjô, 1943)

Synonyms
- Plesispa (Plesispella) spaethi Chûjô, 1943

Species of beetle

Callistola spaethi is a species of beetle of the family Chrysomelidae. It is found in Micronesia (Palau).

== Life history ==
The recorded host plants for this species are Pandanus species (including Pandanus tenuifolius), Freycinetia palawanensis, Flagellaria indica and Pleomela angustifolia.
