= Trigonoptera gracilis =

Scientific classification
- Domain: Eukaryota
- Kingdom: Animalia
- Phylum: Arthropoda
- Class: Insecta
- Order: Coleoptera
- Suborder: Polyphaga
- Infraorder: Cucujiformia
- Family: Cerambycidae
- Genus: Trigonoptera
- Species: T. gracilis

Binomial name
- Trigonoptera gracilis Aurivillius, 1917

Species of beetle

Trigonoptera gracilis is a species of beetle in the family Cerambycidae. It was described by Per Olof Christopher Aurivillius in 1917. It is known from Australia.
