= Trigonoptera quadrimaculata =

Scientific classification
- Kingdom: Animalia
- Phylum: Arthropoda
- Clade: Pancrustacea
- Class: Insecta
- Order: Coleoptera
- Suborder: Polyphaga
- Infraorder: Cucujiformia
- Family: Cerambycidae
- Genus: Trigonoptera
- Species: T. quadrimaculata

Binomial name
- Trigonoptera quadrimaculata Nonfried, 1894

Species of beetle

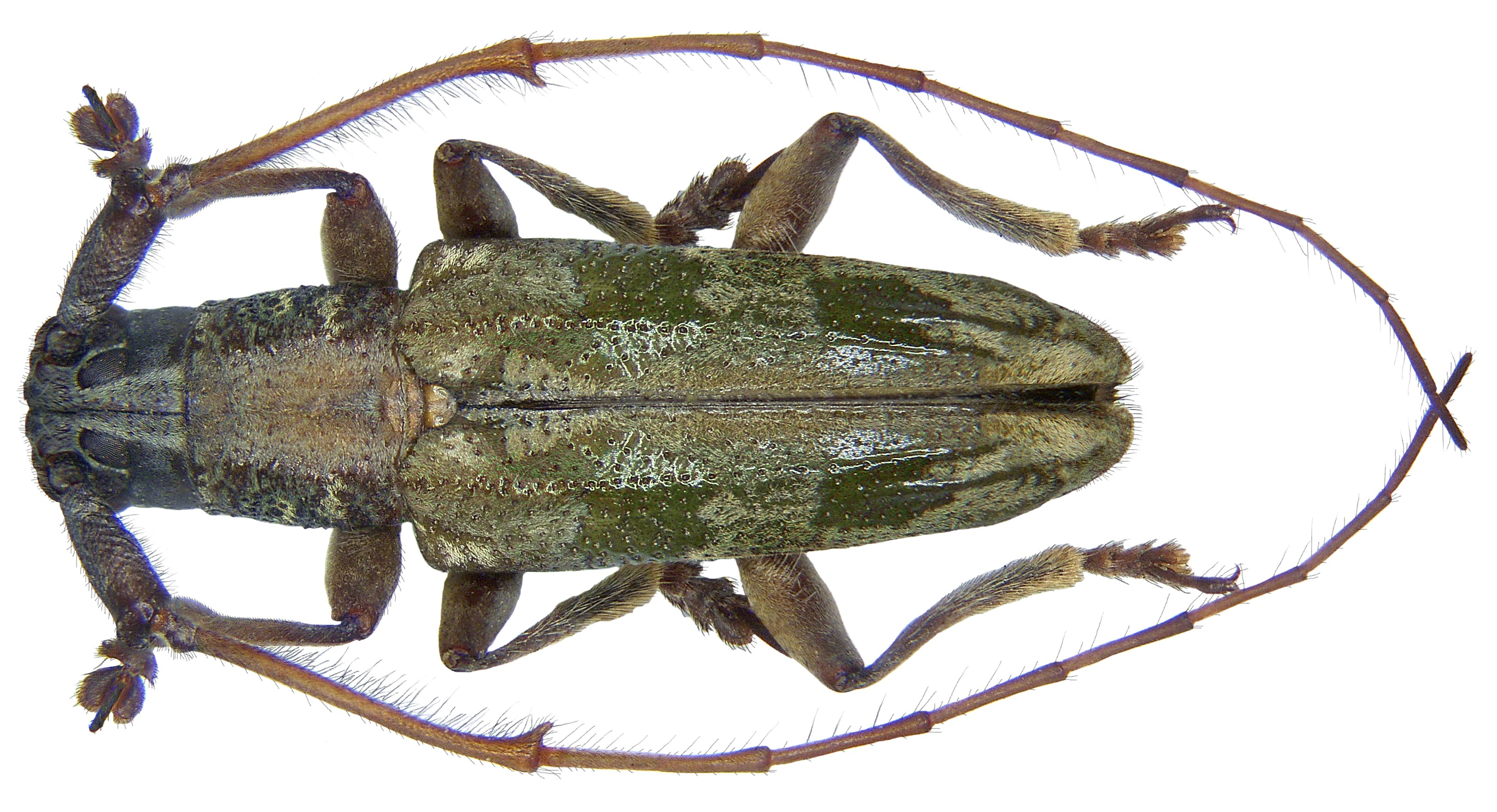
T. quadrimaculata

Trigonoptera quadrimaculata is a species of beetle in the family Cerambycidae. It was described by Nonfried in 1894. It is known from Sumatra.
