= Micrispa gridellii =

Scientific classification
- Kingdom: Animalia
- Phylum: Arthropoda
- Class: Insecta
- Order: Coleoptera
- Suborder: Polyphaga
- Infraorder: Cucujiformia
- Family: Chrysomelidae
- Genus: Micrispa
- Species: M. gridellii

Binomial name
- Micrispa gridellii (Uhmann, 1928)

Synonyms
- Gonophora gridellii Uhmann, 1928

Species of beetle

Micrispa gridellii is a species of beetle of the family Chrysomelidae. It is found in Indonesia (Sumatra).

== Life history ==
No host plant has been documented for this species.
