= Callistola puncticollis =

Scientific classification
- Kingdom: Animalia
- Phylum: Arthropoda
- Clade: Pancrustacea
- Class: Insecta
- Order: Coleoptera
- Suborder: Polyphaga
- Infraorder: Cucujiformia
- Family: Chrysomelidae
- Genus: Callistola
- Species: C. puncticollis

Binomial name
- Callistola puncticollis (Spaeth, 1936)

Synonyms
- Oxycephala puncticollis Spaeth, 1936

Species of beetle

Callistola puncticollis is a species of beetle of the family Chrysomelidae. It is found in western New Guinea.

== Life history ==
No host plant has been documented for this species.
