= Sphigmothorax =

Scientific classification
- Kingdom: Animalia
- Phylum: Arthropoda
- Class: Insecta
- Order: Coleoptera
- Suborder: Polyphaga
- Infraorder: Cucujiformia
- Family: Cerambycidae
- Tribe: Desmiphorini
- Genus: Sphigmothorax

Genus of beetles

Sphigmothorax is a genus of longhorn beetles of the subfamily Lamiinae, containing the following species:

- Sphigmothorax bicinctus Gressitt, 1939
- Sphigmothorax rondoni (Breuning, 1965)
- Sphigmothorax tricinctus Gressitt, 1951
- Sphigmothorax tsushimanus Hayashi, 1961
