= Micrispa minuta =

Scientific classification
- Kingdom: Animalia
- Phylum: Arthropoda
- Clade: Pancrustacea
- Class: Insecta
- Order: Coleoptera
- Suborder: Polyphaga
- Infraorder: Cucujiformia
- Family: Chrysomelidae
- Genus: Micrispa
- Species: M. minuta

Binomial name
- Micrispa minuta (Gestro, 1885)

Synonyms
- Gonophora minuta Gestro, 1885; Micrispa minuscula Gestro, 1899; Gonophora (Micrispa) javana Weise, 1922

Species of beetle

Micrispa minuta is a species of beetle of the family Chrysomelidae. It is found in Indonesia (Java, Sumatra).

== Life history ==
No host plant has been documented for this species.
