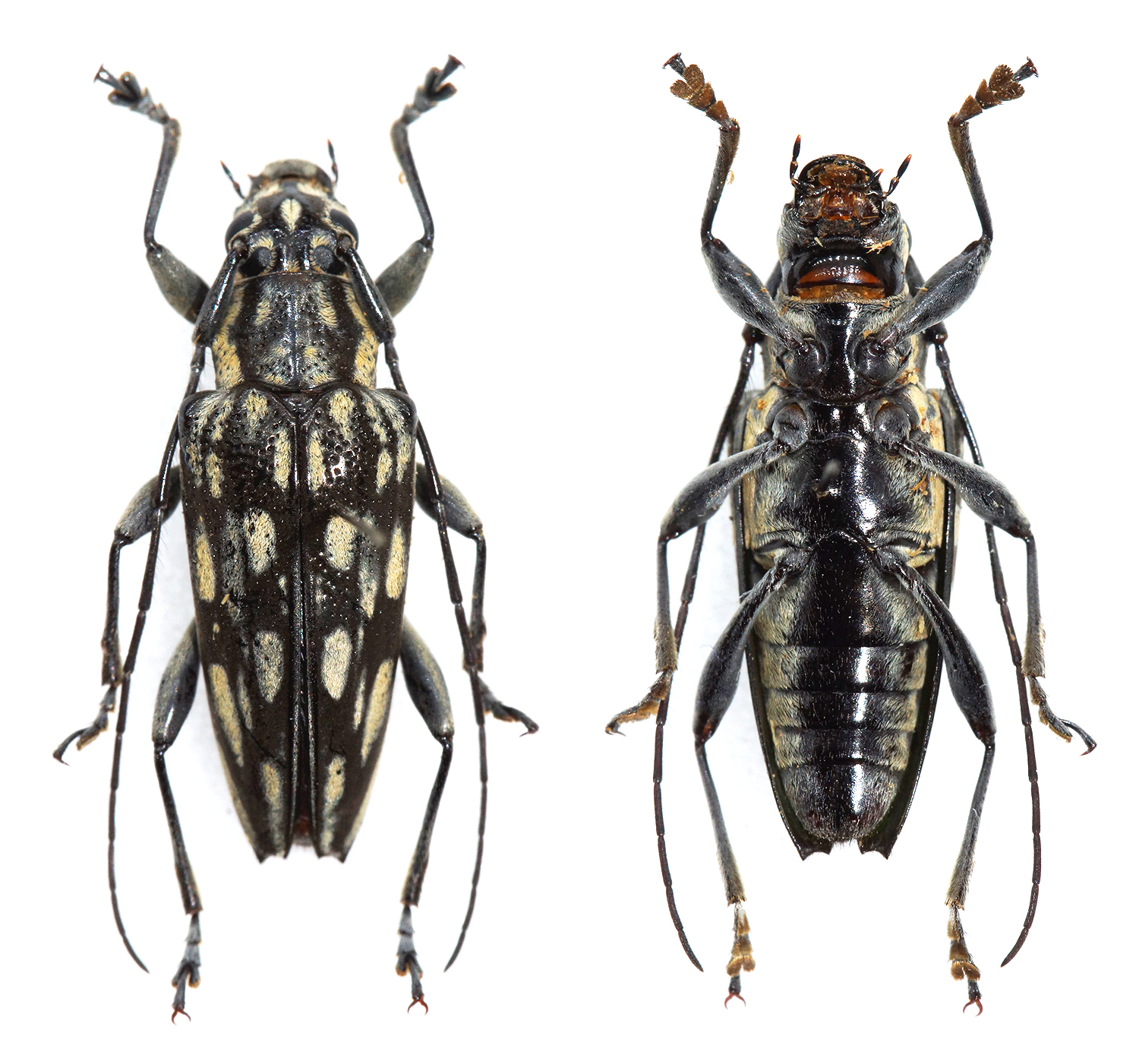
- Trigonoptera woodfordi

Scientific classification
- Kingdom: Animalia
- Phylum: Arthropoda
- Class: Insecta
- Order: Coleoptera
- Suborder: Polyphaga
- Infraorder: Cucujiformia
- Family: Cerambycidae
- Genus: Trigonoptera
- Species: T. woodfordi

Binomial name
- Trigonoptera woodfordi Gahan, 1888

= Trigonoptera woodfordi =

Species of beetle

Trigonoptera woodfordi is a species of beetle in the family Cerambycidae. It was described by Charles Joseph Gahan in 1888. It is known from the Solomon Islands.
