= Callistola grossa =

Scientific classification
- Kingdom: Animalia
- Phylum: Arthropoda
- Clade: Pancrustacea
- Class: Insecta
- Order: Coleoptera
- Suborder: Polyphaga
- Infraorder: Cucujiformia
- Family: Chrysomelidae
- Genus: Callistola
- Species: C. grossa

Binomial name
- Callistola grossa (Maulik, 1936)

Synonyms
- Oxycephala grossa Maulik, 1936

Species of beetle

Callistola grossa is a species of beetle of the family Chrysomelidae. It is found on the Moluccas.

== Life history ==
The recorded host plants for this species are Pandanus species.
