= Sphigmothorax bicinctus =

Scientific classification
- Kingdom: Animalia
- Phylum: Arthropoda
- Class: Insecta
- Order: Coleoptera
- Suborder: Polyphaga
- Infraorder: Cucujiformia
- Family: Cerambycidae
- Genus: Sphigmothorax
- Species: S. bicinctus

Binomial name
- Sphigmothorax bicinctus Gressitt, 1939

Species of beetle

Sphigmothorax bicinctus is a species of beetle in the family Cerambycidae. It was described by Gressitt in 1939.
