= Callistola speciosa =

Scientific classification
- Kingdom: Animalia
- Phylum: Arthropoda
- Clade: Pancrustacea
- Class: Insecta
- Order: Coleoptera
- Suborder: Polyphaga
- Infraorder: Cucujiformia
- Family: Chrysomelidae
- Genus: Callistola
- Species: C. speciosa

Binomial name
- Callistola speciosa (Boisduval, 1835)

Synonyms
- Hispa speciosa Boisduval, 1835; Oxycephala speciosa blanchardi Weise, 1908; Oxycephala speciosa guerini Weise, 1908; Oxycephala fasciata Weise, 1905

Species of beetle

Callistola speciosa is a species of beetle of the family Chrysomelidae. It is found in Indonesia (Sulawesi), New Britain and New Guinea.

== Life history ==
The recorded host plants for this species are Pandanus species.

== Subspecies ==
- Callistola speciosa speciosa (eastern Indonesia, western and northern New Guinea)
- Callistola speciosa fasciata (Weise, 1905) (eastern Papua New Guinea)
