= Callistola boisduvali =

Scientific classification
- Kingdom: Animalia
- Phylum: Arthropoda
- Clade: Pancrustacea
- Class: Insecta
- Order: Coleoptera
- Suborder: Polyphaga
- Infraorder: Cucujiformia
- Family: Chrysomelidae
- Genus: Callistola
- Species: C. boisduvali

Binomial name
- Callistola boisduvali (Weise, 1908)

Synonyms
- Oxycephala speciosa boisduvali Weise, 1908; Callistola dilutipes buloloensis Gressitt, 1957; Callistola boisduvali bulolensis

Species of beetle

Callistola boisduvali is a species of beetle of the family Chrysomelidae. It is found in New Guinea.

== Life history ==
The recorded host plants for this species are Pandanus species.
