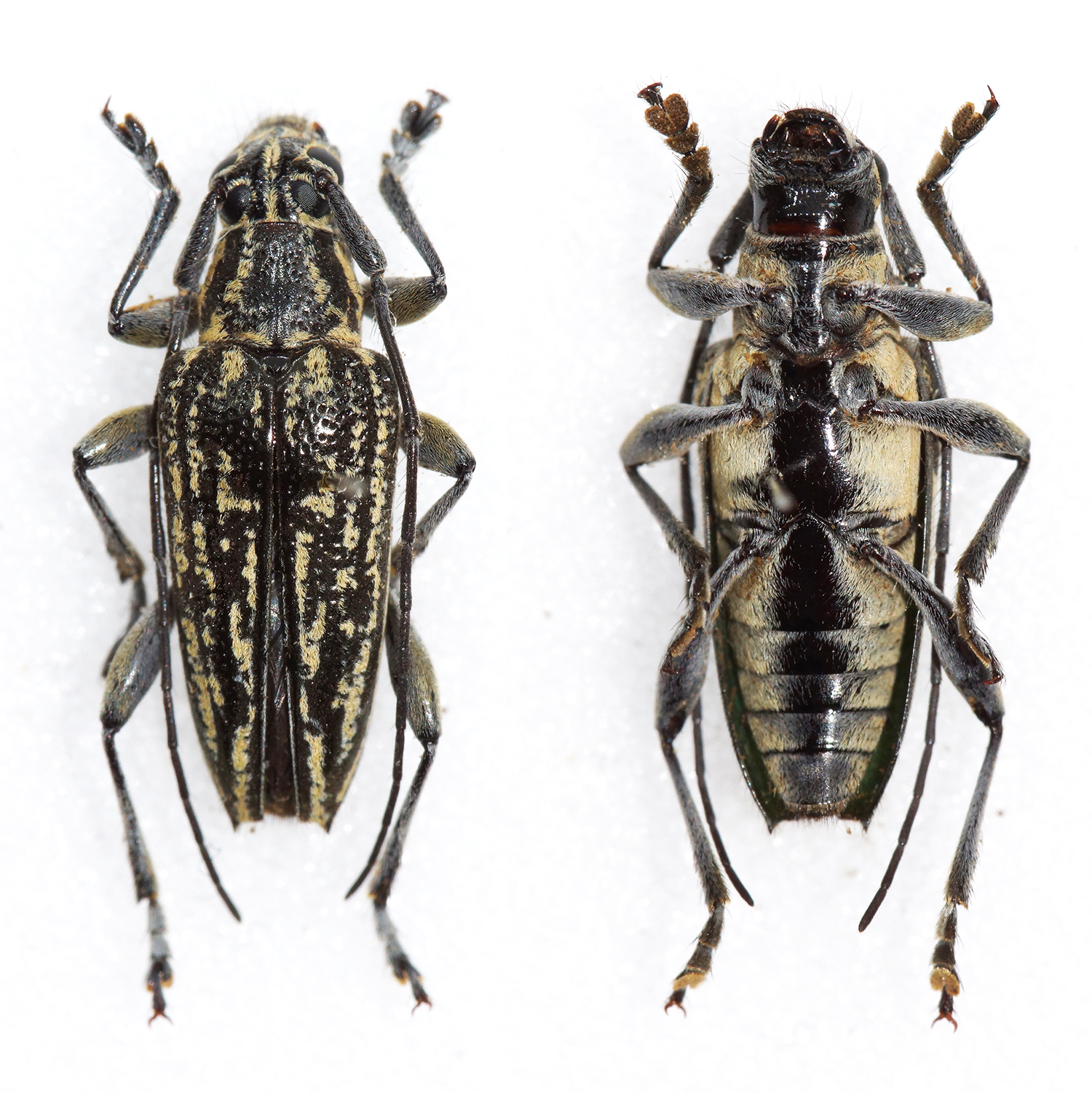
- Trigonoptera nervosa

Scientific classification
- Domain: Eukaryota
- Kingdom: Animalia
- Phylum: Arthropoda
- Class: Insecta
- Order: Coleoptera
- Suborder: Polyphaga
- Infraorder: Cucujiformia
- Family: Cerambycidae
- Genus: Trigonoptera
- Species: T. nervosa

Binomial name
- Trigonoptera nervosa (Pascoe, 1867)

= Trigonoptera nervosa =

Species of beetle

Trigonoptera nervosa is a species of beetle in the family Cerambycidae. It was described by Francis Polkinghorne Pascoe in 1867.
