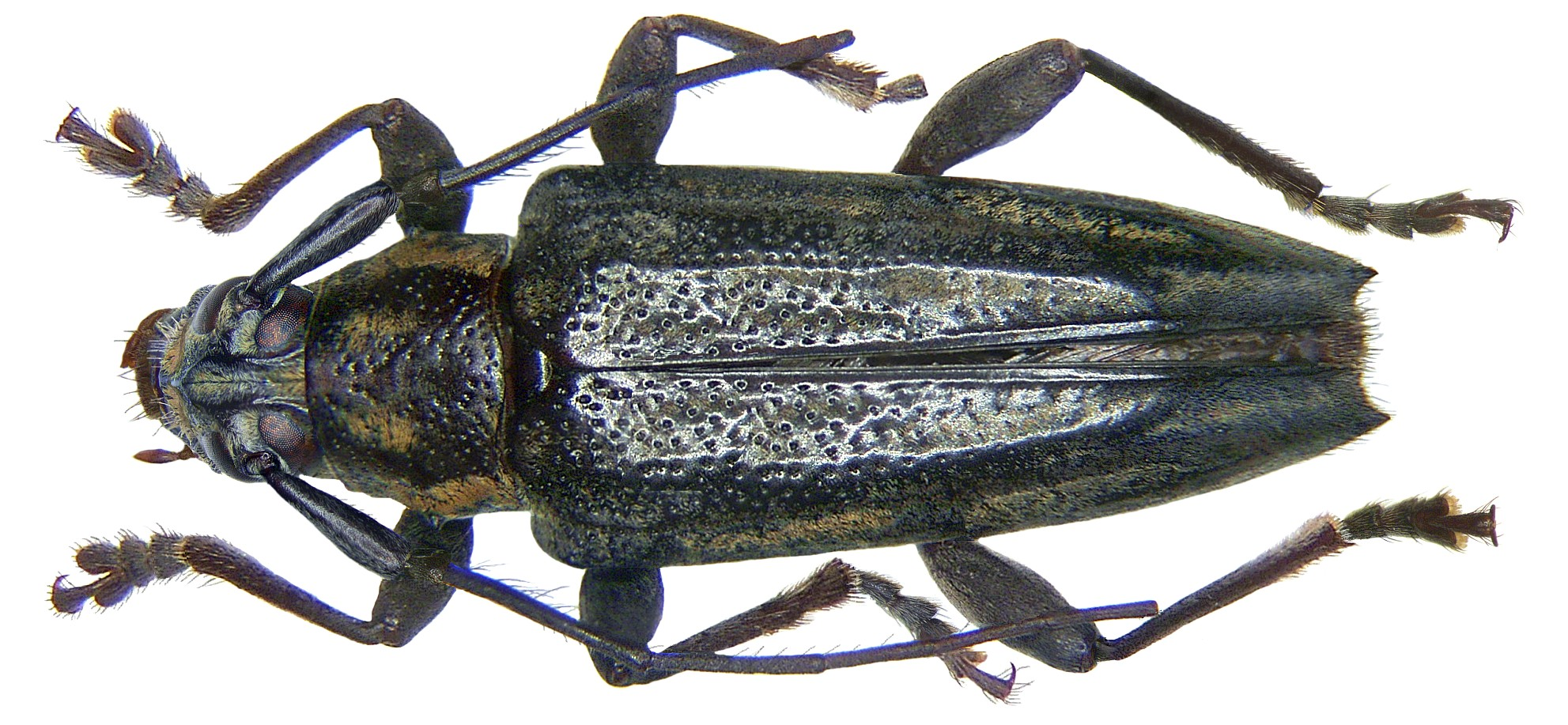

Scientific classification
- Kingdom: Animalia
- Phylum: Arthropoda
- Class: Insecta
- Order: Coleoptera
- Suborder: Polyphaga
- Infraorder: Cucujiformia
- Family: Cerambycidae
- Genus: Trigonoptera
- Species: T. amboinica

Binomial name
- Trigonoptera amboinica Breuning, 1968

= Trigonoptera amboinica =

Species of beetle

Trigonoptera amboinica is a species of beetle in the family Cerambycidae. It was described by Stephan von Breuning in 1968.
