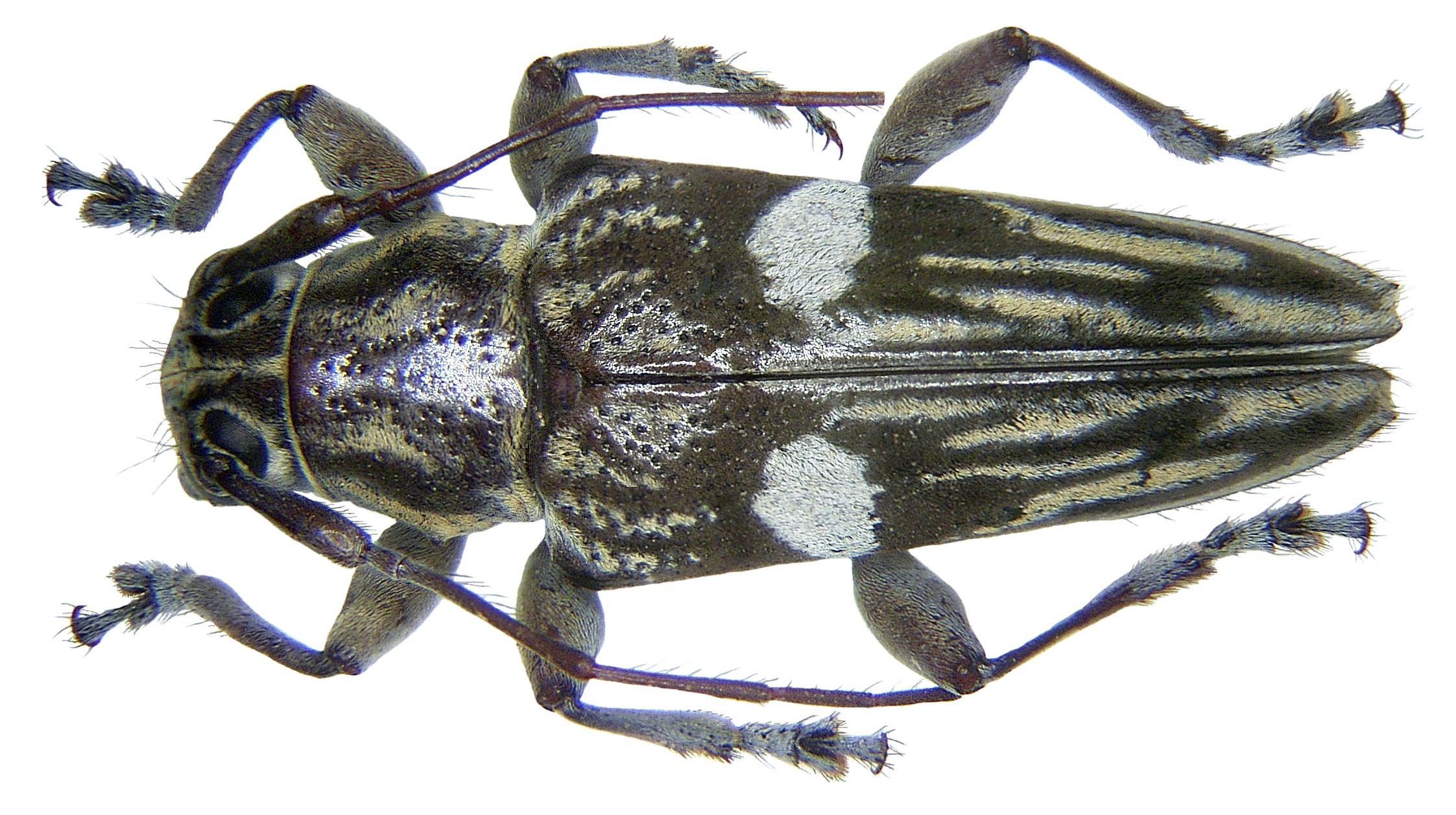
- Trigonoptera bimaculata

Scientific classification
- Kingdom: Animalia
- Phylum: Arthropoda
- Class: Insecta
- Order: Coleoptera
- Suborder: Polyphaga
- Infraorder: Cucujiformia
- Family: Cerambycidae
- Subfamily: Lamiinae
- Tribe: Tmesisternini
- Genus: Trigonoptera; Perroud, 1855

= Trigonoptera =

Genus of beetles

Trigonoptera is a genus of longhorn beetles of the subfamily Lamiinae, containing the following species:

- Trigonoptera acuminata Gressitt, 1984
- Trigonoptera albocollaris Gilmour, 1950
- Trigonoptera amboinica Breuning, 1968
- Trigonoptera annulicornis Gressitt, 1984
- Trigonoptera bimaculata Thomson, 1865
- Trigonoptera breuningiana Gilmour, 1950
- Trigonoptera cincta Gressitt, 1984
- Trigonoptera complicata Gressitt, 1984
- Trigonoptera fergussoni Breuning, 1970
- Trigonoptera flavicollis Breuning, 1940
- Trigonoptera flavipicta (Pascoe, 1867)
- Trigonoptera flavoscutellata Breuning, 1939
- Trigonoptera gracilis Aurivillius, 1917
- Trigonoptera grisea Gressitt, 1984
- Trigonoptera guttulata (Gestro, 1876)
- Trigonoptera harlequina Gressitt, 1984
- Trigonoptera humeralis Gressitt, 1984
- Trigonoptera immaculata Gilmour, 1950
- Trigonoptera iriana Gressitt, 1984
- Trigonoptera isabellae Gilmour, 1949
- Trigonoptera japeni Gilmour, 1949
- Trigonoptera laevipunctata Breuning, 1950
- Trigonoptera lateplagiata Breuning, 1940
- Trigonoptera leptura (Gestro, 1876)
- Trigonoptera maculata Perroud, 1855
- Trigonoptera maculifascia Gressitt, 1984
- Trigonoptera margaretae Gilmour, 1949
- Trigonoptera marmorata Aurivillius, 1908
- Trigonoptera montana Gressitt, 1984
- Trigonoptera monticorum Gressitt, 1984
- Trigonoptera muruana Gressitt, 1984
- Trigonoptera muscifluvis Gressitt, 1984
- Trigonoptera neja Gilmour, 1950
- Trigonoptera nervosa (Pascoe, 1867)
- Trigonoptera nigrofasciata Gressitt, 1984
- Trigonoptera nothofagi Gressitt, 1984
- Trigonoptera obscura Gilmour, 1949
- Trigonoptera olivacea Aurivillius, 1908
- Trigonoptera ornata (MacLeay, 1886)
- Trigonoptera paravittata Breuning, 1970
- Trigonoptera perspicax Gressitt, 1984
- Trigonoptera pseudomaculata Breuning, 1939
- Trigonoptera quadrimaculata Nonfried, 1894
- Trigonoptera regina Gressitt, 1984
- Trigonoptera sordida (Pascoe, 1867)
- Trigonoptera spilonota (Gestro, 1876)
- Trigonoptera sulcata Aurivillius, 1924
- Trigonoptera sumbawana Breuning, 1948
- Trigonoptera sumptuosa Gressitt, 1984
- Trigonoptera tesselata (Pascoe, 1867)
- Trigonoptera transversefasciata Gilmour, 1949
- Trigonoptera trikora Gressitt, 1984
- Trigonoptera trobriandensis Breuning, 1948
- Trigonoptera vittata Gestro, 1876
- Trigonoptera woodfordi Gahan, 1888
