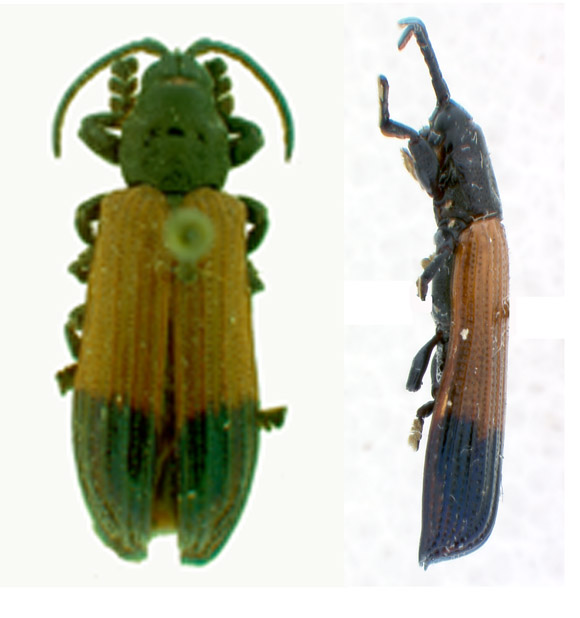

Scientific classification
- Kingdom: Animalia
- Phylum: Arthropoda
- Clade: Pancrustacea
- Class: Insecta
- Order: Coleoptera
- Suborder: Polyphaga
- Infraorder: Cucujiformia
- Family: Chrysomelidae
- Genus: Callistola
- Species: C. tripartita

Binomial name
- Callistola tripartita (Fairmaire, 1883)

Synonyms
- Oxycephala tripartita Fairmaire, 1883; Oxycephala wallacei Baly, 1887; Oxycephala dentata Uhmann, 1926

= Callistola tripartita =

Species of beetle

Callistola tripartita is a species of beetle of the family Chrysomelidae. It is found in Australia, the Bismarck Archipelago (New Britain, Duke of York, New Ireland, Tabor).

== Life history ==
The recorded host plants for this species are Cocos nucifera and Pandanus species.
