= Callistola esakii =

Scientific classification
- Kingdom: Animalia
- Phylum: Arthropoda
- Clade: Pancrustacea
- Class: Insecta
- Order: Coleoptera
- Suborder: Polyphaga
- Infraorder: Cucujiformia
- Family: Chrysomelidae
- Genus: Callistola
- Species: C. esakii

Binomial name
- Callistola esakii (Chûjô, 1943)

Synonyms
- Plesispa (Plesispella) esakii Chûjô, 1943

Species of beetle

Callistola esakii is a species of beetle of the family Chrysomelidae. It is found in Micronesia (Palau).

== Life history ==
The recorded host plants for this species are Pandanus species, Freycinetia palauensis, Flagellaria and Pleomela species.
