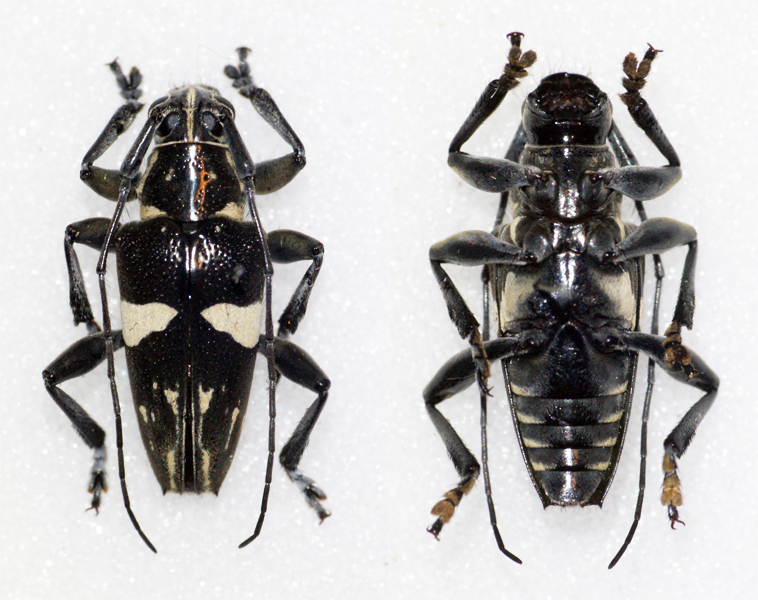

Scientific classification
- Domain: Eukaryota
- Kingdom: Animalia
- Phylum: Arthropoda
- Class: Insecta
- Order: Coleoptera
- Suborder: Polyphaga
- Infraorder: Cucujiformia
- Family: Cerambycidae
- Genus: Trigonoptera
- Species: T. spilonota

Binomial name
- Trigonoptera spilonota (Gestro, 1876)

Synonyms
- Arsysia spilonota Gestro, 1876

= Trigonoptera spilonota =

Species of beetle

Trigonoptera spilonota is a species of beetle in the family Cerambycidae. It was described by Gestro in 1876, originally under the genus Arsysia. It is known from Papua New Guinea and Indonesia.

== Subspecies ==
- Trigonoptera spilonota spilonota (Gestro, 1876)
- Trigonoptera spilonota albonotata Gahan, 1915
