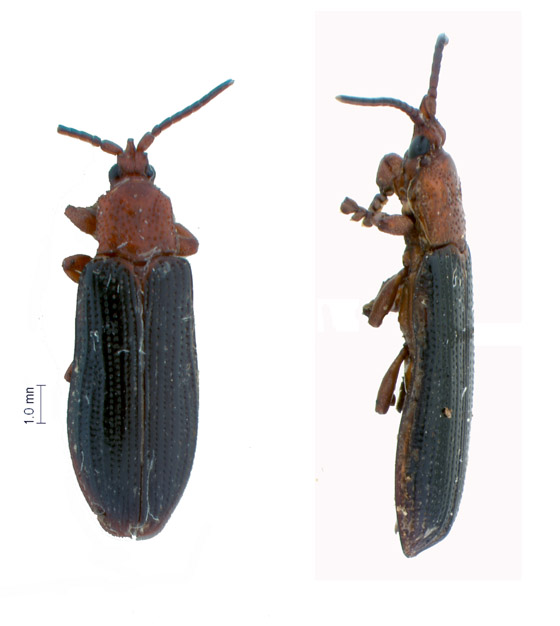

Scientific classification
- Kingdom: Animalia
- Phylum: Arthropoda
- Clade: Pancrustacea
- Class: Insecta
- Order: Coleoptera
- Suborder: Polyphaga
- Infraorder: Cucujiformia
- Family: Chrysomelidae
- Genus: Callistola
- Species: C. ruficollis

Binomial name
- Callistola ruficollis (Spaeth, 1936)

Synonyms
- Plesispa (Plesispa) ruficollis Spaeth, 1936

= Callistola ruficollis =

Species of beetle

Callistola ruficollis is a species of beetle of the family Chrysomelidae. It is found on the Admiralty Islands.

== Life history ==
The recorded host plant for this species is Cocos nucifera. There is also a record on Heliconia species.
