= Trigonoptera lateplagiata =

Scientific classification
- Kingdom: Animalia
- Phylum: Arthropoda
- Class: Insecta
- Order: Coleoptera
- Suborder: Polyphaga
- Infraorder: Cucujiformia
- Family: Cerambycidae
- Genus: Trigonoptera
- Species: T. lateplagiata

Binomial name
- Trigonoptera lateplagiata Breuning, 1940

Species of beetle

Trigonoptera lateplagiata is a species of beetle in the family Cerambycidae. It was described by Stephan von Breuning in 1940.
