= Micrispa =

Scientific classification
- Kingdom: Animalia
- Phylum: Arthropoda
- Class: Insecta
- Order: Coleoptera
- Suborder: Polyphaga
- Infraorder: Cucujiformia
- Family: Chrysomelidae
- Subfamily: Cassidinae
- Tribe: Gonophorini
- Genus: Micrispa; Gestro, 1897

Genus of leaf beetles

Micrispa is a genus of beetles belonging to the family Chrysomelidae.

== Species ==
- Micrispa alpiniae (Gressitt, 1957)
- Micrispa biakana (Gressitt, 1963)
- Micrispa bouchardi Gestro, 1906
- Micrispa bryanti (Uhmann, 1938)
- Micrispa costi (Gressitt, 1957)
- Micrispa cubicularis Gressitt, 1963
- Micrispa cyperaceae (Gressitt, 1960)
- Micrispa dentatithorax (Pic, 1924)
- Micrispa donaxiae (Gressitt, 1963)
- Micrispa exigua (Gestro, 1899)
- Micrispa gestroi Weise, 1905
- Micrispa gridellii (Uhmann, 1928)
- Micrispa humilis (Gestro, 1919)
- Micrispa maai (Gressitt, 1963)
- Micrispa majuscula Gestro, 1907
- Micrispa minuta (Gestro, 1885)
- Micrispa moultonii Gestro, 1909
- Micrispa musae (Gressitt, 1963)
- Micrispa pellucida (Gressitt, 1957)
- Micrispa puncticollis (Gressitt, 1963)
- Micrispa scleriae (Gressitt, 1963)
- Micrispa semicosta (Gressitt, 1957)
- Micrispa semifusca (Gestro, 1899)
- Micrispa semiviridis (Gressitt, 1963)
- Micrispa sinuata (Gestro, 1885)
- Micrispa sinuicosta (Gressitt, 1957)
- Micrispa vulnerata (Gestro, 1895)
- Micrispa zinzibaris (Motschulsky, 1863)
- Micrispa zingiberaceae (Gressitt, 1963)
