= Trigonoptera flavicollis =

Scientific classification
- Kingdom: Animalia
- Phylum: Arthropoda
- Class: Insecta
- Order: Coleoptera
- Suborder: Polyphaga
- Infraorder: Cucujiformia
- Family: Cerambycidae
- Genus: Trigonoptera
- Species: T. flavicollis

Binomial name
- Trigonoptera flavicollis Breuning, 1940

Species of beetle

Trigonoptera flavicollis is a species of beetle in the family Cerambycidae. It was described by Stephan von Breuning in 1940.

== Subspecies ==
- Trigonoptera flavicollis stictica Breuning, 1940
- Trigonoptera flavicollis flavicollis Breuning, 1940
