= Micrispa zinzibaris =

Scientific classification
- Kingdom: Animalia
- Phylum: Arthropoda
- Class: Insecta
- Order: Coleoptera
- Suborder: Polyphaga
- Infraorder: Cucujiformia
- Family: Chrysomelidae
- Genus: Micrispa
- Species: M. zinzibaris

Binomial name
- Micrispa zinzibaris (Motschulsky, 1863)

Synonyms
- Anisodera zinzibaris Motschulsky, 1863; Gonophora akalankita Maulik, 1919

Species of beetle

Micrispa zinzibaris is a species of beetle of the family Chrysomelidae. It is found in Sri Lanka.

== Life history ==
The host plant for this species is an unidentified species of ginger (Zingiberaceae).
