= Callistola corporaali =

Scientific classification
- Kingdom: Animalia
- Phylum: Arthropoda
- Clade: Pancrustacea
- Class: Insecta
- Order: Coleoptera
- Suborder: Polyphaga
- Infraorder: Cucujiformia
- Family: Chrysomelidae
- Genus: Callistola
- Species: C. corporaali

Binomial name
- Callistola corporaali (Uhmann, 1932)

Synonyms
- Oxycephala corporaali Uhmann, 1932

Species of beetle

Callistola corporaali is a species of beetle of the family Chrysomelidae. It is found on the Moluccas.

== Life history ==
The recorded host plants for this species are Pandanus species.
