= Callistola pandani =

Scientific classification
- Kingdom: Animalia
- Phylum: Arthropoda
- Clade: Pancrustacea
- Class: Insecta
- Order: Coleoptera
- Suborder: Polyphaga
- Infraorder: Cucujiformia
- Family: Chrysomelidae
- Genus: Callistola
- Species: C. pandani

Binomial name
- Callistola pandani (Maulik, 1936)

Synonyms
- Oxycephala pandani Maulik, 1936

Species of beetle

Callistola pandani is a species of beetle of the family Chrysomelidae. It is found in Micronesia (Palau).

== Life history ==
The recorded host plants for this species are Pandanus tectorius and Pandanus kanethirae.
