= Trigonoptera leptura =

Scientific classification
- Domain: Eukaryota
- Kingdom: Animalia
- Phylum: Arthropoda
- Class: Insecta
- Order: Coleoptera
- Suborder: Polyphaga
- Infraorder: Cucujiformia
- Family: Cerambycidae
- Genus: Trigonoptera
- Species: T. leptura

Binomial name
- Trigonoptera leptura (Gestro, 1876)

Synonyms
- Arsysia leptura Gestro, 1876

Species of beetle

Trigonoptera leptura is a species of beetle in the family Cerambycidae. It was described by Gestro in 1876, originally under the genus Arsysia.
