= Micrispa sinuata =

Scientific classification
- Kingdom: Animalia
- Phylum: Arthropoda
- Class: Insecta
- Order: Coleoptera
- Suborder: Polyphaga
- Infraorder: Cucujiformia
- Family: Chrysomelidae
- Genus: Micrispa
- Species: M. sinuata

Binomial name
- Micrispa sinuata (Gestro, 1885)

Synonyms
- Gonophora sinuata Gestro, 1885

Species of beetle

Micrispa sinuata is a species of beetle of the family Chrysomelidae. It is found in New Guinea.

== Life history ==
No host plant has been documented for this species.
