= Micrispa bouchardi =

Scientific classification
- Kingdom: Animalia
- Phylum: Arthropoda
- Clade: Pancrustacea
- Class: Insecta
- Order: Coleoptera
- Suborder: Polyphaga
- Infraorder: Cucujiformia
- Family: Chrysomelidae
- Genus: Micrispa
- Species: M. bouchardi

Binomial name
- Micrispa bouchardi Gestro, 1906

Species of beetle

Micrispa bouchardi is a species of beetle of the family Chrysomelidae. It is found in Indonesia (Java, Sumatra).

== Life history ==
No host plant has been documented for this species.
