= Trigonoptera ornata =

Scientific classification
- Kingdom: Animalia
- Phylum: Arthropoda
- Class: Insecta
- Order: Coleoptera
- Suborder: Polyphaga
- Infraorder: Cucujiformia
- Family: Cerambycidae
- Genus: Trigonoptera
- Species: T. ornata

Binomial name
- Trigonoptera ornata (W. J. Macleay, 1886)

Synonyms
- Trigonoptera erythrospila Heller, 1912; Aegomomus ornatus W. J. Macleay, 1886

Species of beetle

Trigonoptera ornata is a species of beetle in the family Cerambycidae. It was described by William John Macleay in 1886, originally under the genus Aegomomus.
