= Sphigmothorax tsushimanus =

Scientific classification
- Kingdom: Animalia
- Phylum: Arthropoda
- Class: Insecta
- Order: Coleoptera
- Suborder: Polyphaga
- Infraorder: Cucujiformia
- Family: Cerambycidae
- Genus: Sphigmothorax
- Species: S. tsushimanus

Binomial name
- Sphigmothorax tsushimanus Hayashi, 1961

Species of beetle

Sphigmothorax tsushimanus is a species of beetle in the family Cerambycidae. It was described by Hayashi in 1961.
