= Callistola bruijnii =

Scientific classification
- Kingdom: Animalia
- Phylum: Arthropoda
- Clade: Pancrustacea
- Class: Insecta
- Order: Coleoptera
- Suborder: Polyphaga
- Infraorder: Cucujiformia
- Family: Chrysomelidae
- Genus: Callistola
- Species: C. bruijnii

Binomial name
- Callistola bruijnii (Gestro, 1885)

Synonyms
- Oxycephala bruijnii Gestro, 1885; Oxycephala bruijnii morotaiensis Spaeth, 1936; Callistola bruijnii wegneri Uhmann, 1960

Species of beetle

Callistola bruijnii is a species of beetle of the family Chrysomelidae. It is found in New Guinea.

== Life history ==
No host plant has been documented for this species.
