= Callistola dilutipes =

Scientific classification
- Kingdom: Animalia
- Phylum: Arthropoda
- Clade: Pancrustacea
- Class: Insecta
- Order: Coleoptera
- Suborder: Polyphaga
- Infraorder: Cucujiformia
- Family: Chrysomelidae
- Genus: Callistola
- Species: C. dilutipes

Binomial name
- Callistola dilutipes (Weise, 1905)

Synonyms
- Oxycephala dilutipes Weise, 1905; Callistola dilutipes alexandrina Gressitt, 1963

Species of beetle

Callistola dilutipes is a species of beetle of the family Chrysomelidae. It is found in north-western New Guinea.

== Description ==
Adults reach a length of about 10.5-13 mm. They are yellowish testaceous to steely and purplish blue.

== Life history ==
The recorded host plants for this species are Pandanus species. The larvae and pupae have also been described. The larvae are testaceous, becoming slightly pitchy brown on areas of the caudal process. The pupae are testaceous, but reddish on the cephalic processes.
