= Judson Linsley Gressitt =

American entomologist (1914–1982)

- Born: 16 June 1914; Tokyo, Empire of Japan
- Died: 26 April 1982 (aged 67); Guilin, Guangxi, China
- Occupations: Entomologist, naturalist
- Spouse: Margaret Kriete
- Children: 4
- Relatives: Felicia Gressitt Bock (sister); Audie Bock (niece)

Judson Linsley Gressitt (16 June 1914 – 26 April 1982) was an American entomologist and naturalist who worked in Japan and China. He worked mainly on beetle diversity in Southeast Asia and in applied areas, particularly medical entomology, and was the founder of the journal Pacific Insects (which became the International Journal of Entomology) and the Wau Ecology Institute in Papua New Guinea. Apart from insects, he collected specimens in numerous taxa and several have been named after him.

== Life ==
Gressitt was born in Tokyo, Japan, where his parents were Baptist missionaries. The family became refugees after the earthquake of 1923 and they moved to Oakland, California in 1925 where he recovered from pneumonia and typhoid. Through his cousin E. Gorton Linsley, he became interested in insects and the outdoors as Boy Scouts where they were influenced by Brighton C. Cain. He began to collect specimens in the Sierra Nevada and when the family moved back to Japan, he began to work at the USDA lab in Yokohama. In 1932 he graduated from the American School, Tokyo and taught English at a Japanese school for a year. He made a visit to Formosa for three months between studies at Stanford University and collected nearly 50000 specimens. In 1935 he moved from Stanford to UC Berkeley and obtained a BS in 1938 followed by a Master's in 1939. His first entomological publication was on Japanese Cerambycidae. After his MS, he worked at the Lingnan Natural History Museum in Canton and taught at the Lingnan University.

In 1941, he married Margaret Kriete, who also came from an American missionary family in Japan. Margaret was interested in music, teaching music at the Honolulu Symphony, and took a keen interest in natural history publishing along with Linsley. The Japanese placed the couple under internship in Canton on December 8, 1941 (in Canton time, the day of the Japanese attack on Pearl Harbor) and later kept separate during which time their first daughter was born. The family was reunited only in 1943 and returned to the United States. Linsley then worked at Berkeley and received a Ph.D. in 1945 for research on the Cassidinae. He worked towards the end of the war with the US Medical Research Unit in Guam, Philippines, and Japan. In the 1950s he returned to work in Southeast Asia and took part in an expedition to study Metasequoia glyptostroboides, a living fossil in Sichuan. In 1950, the family was again interned in Canton at the beginning of the Korean War and was released only in 1951. In 1952, the family moved to Honolulu and he worked at the Bishop Museum. He was a Guggenheim Fellow in 1955 and a Fellow of the Entomological Society of America since 1943. In 1965 he explored the insects of the Antarctic region.

Gressitt founded the journal Pacific Insects and published numerous descriptions. He published nearly 300 papers, mostly monograph and worked mainly on beetles. Gressitt Glacier in Antarctica was named after him. He and his wife were killed in an aircrash on a routine flight (CAAC Flight 3303) from Canton to Guilin where he had been invited to talk. They had four daughters. The species Paramelomys gressitti; the leaf-beetle genera Gressittella and Gressittana; and the horsefly genus Gressittia are named after him.

== See also ==
- Category:Taxa named by Judson Linsley Gressitt
