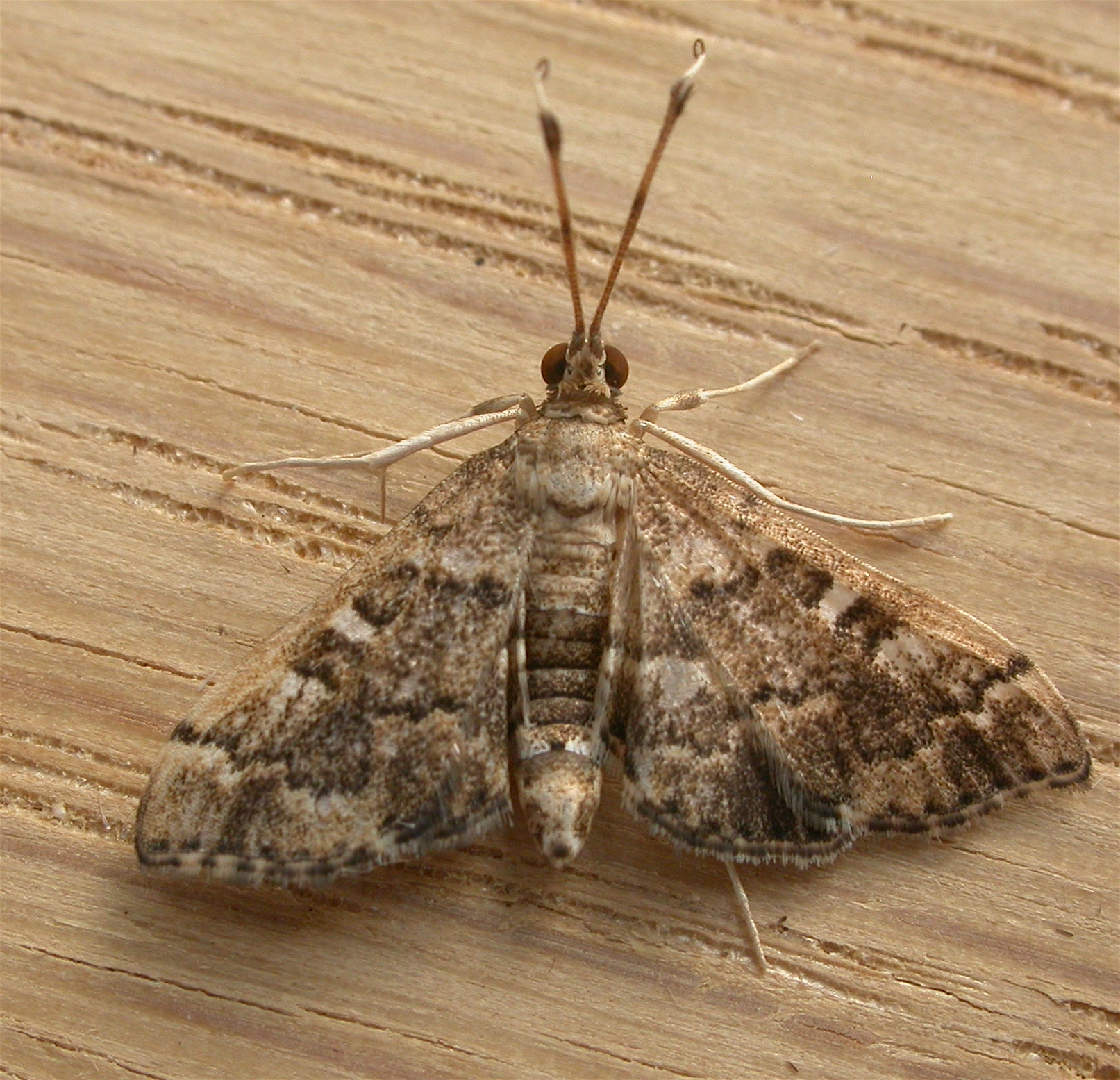
- Nacoleia rhoeoalis

Scientific classification
- Kingdom: Animalia
- Phylum: Arthropoda
- Clade: Pancrustacea
- Class: Insecta
- Order: Lepidoptera
- Family: Crambidae
- Subfamily: Spilomelinae
- Genus: Nacoleia; Walker, 1859

Synonyms
- Aplomastix Warren, 1890; Orthocona Warren, 1896; Semioceros Meyrick, 1884

= Nacoleia (moth) =

Genus of moths

Nacoleia is a genus of moths of the family Crambidae described by Francis Walker in 1859.

Nacolei Octasema according to the French Panel on Plant Health is considered a quarantine pest in the areas of Guadeloupe and Martinique. The reason being is that both those area have an export market that can acts transport for that organism.

== Species ==
- Nacoleia acyperalis Hampson, 1912
- Nacoleia affinis Rothschild, 1915
- Nacoleia albicilialis Hampson, 1903
- Nacoleia albiflavalis Hampson, 1903
- Nacoleia alincia Turner, 1908
- Nacoleia allocosma (Meyrick, 1886)
- Nacoleia amphicedalis (Walker, 1859)
- Nacoleia asaphialis Hampson, 1912
- Nacoleia assimilis Rothschild, 1915
- Nacoleia attenualis Hampson, 1912
- Nacoleia aurantiimaculalis Rothschild, 1915
- Nacoleia aurealis Gaede, 1916
- Nacoleia auronitens Gaede, 1916
- Nacoleia aurotinctalis Hampson, 1899
- Nacoleia chagosalis T. B. Fletcher, 1910
- Nacoleia charesalis (Walker, 1859)
- Nacoleia chromalis Hampson, 1912
- Nacoleia conisota Hampson, 1912
- Nacoleia dactyloptila (Meyrick, 1886) (from Fiji)
- Nacoleia defloralis (Snellen, 1880)
- Nacoleia disemalis Hampson, 1912
- Nacoleia distinctalis Rothschild, 1915
- Nacoleia dizona Hampson, 1912
- Nacoleia euryphaealis Hampson, 1912
- Nacoleia eximialis (Warren, 1896)
- Nacoleia fumidalis (Leech, 1889)
- Nacoleia fuscalis Rothschild, 1915
- Nacoleia fuscicilialis Hampson, 1908
- Nacoleia fuscifusalis Hampson, 1912
- Nacoleia glageropa Turner, 1908
- Nacoleia gressitti Inoue, 1996
- Nacoleia immundalis South in Leech & South, 1901
- Nacoleia inouei Yamanaka, 1980
- Nacoleia insolitalis Walker, 1862
- Nacoleia junctithyralis Hampson, 1898
- Nacoleia leucographalis Hampson, 1912
- Nacoleia leucosemalis Hampson, 1912
- Nacoleia lophotalis Hampson, 1912
- Nacoleia lunidiscalis Hampson, 1899
- Nacoleia megaspilalis Hampson, 1912
- Nacoleia melaprocta Hampson, 1912
- Nacoleia mesochlora (Meyrick, 1884)
- Nacoleia moninalis (Walker, 1859)
- Nacoleia obliqualis Hampson, 1898
- Nacoleia ochrizonalis Hampson, 1912
- Nacoleia octasema (Meyrick, 1886)
- Nacoleia oncophragma Turner, 1908
- Nacoleia pachytornalis Hampson, 1912
- Nacoleia parapsephis (Meyrick, 1887)
- Nacoleia perdentalis Hampson, 1899
- Nacoleia perstygialis Hampson, 1912
- Nacoleia pervulgalis Hampson, 1912
- Nacoleia phaeopasta Hampson, 1912
- Nacoleia puncticostalis Hampson, 1899
- Nacoleia rectistrialis Hampson, 1912
- Nacoleia rhoeoalis (Walker, 1859)
- Nacoleia rubralis Hampson, 1899
- Nacoleia rufiterminalis Hampson, 1899
- Nacoleia satsumalis South in Leech & South, 1901
- Nacoleia selenalis Hampson, 1912
- Nacoleia sordidalis Rothschild, 1915
- Nacoleia sorosi Kirpichnikova, 1999
- Nacoleia subalbalis Hampson, 1912
- Nacoleia syngenica Turner, 1913
- Nacoleia trichogyialis Hampson, 1912
- Nacoleia tricrossa (Meyrick, 1886)
- Nacoleia ustalis (Hampson, 1891)
- Nacoleia ustulalis Hampson, 1903
- Nacoleia vittifera Hampson, 1899
- Nacoleia wollastoni Rothschild, 1915
- Nacoleia xanthota Hampson, 1912

== Former species ==
- Nacoleia argyropalis Hampson, 1908
- Nacoleia commixta (Butler, 1879)
- Nacoleia distinctifascia Rothschild, 1916
- Nacoleia insulicola T. B. Fletcher, 1922
- Nacoleia maculalis South in Leech & South, 1901
- Nacoleia nigricostalis Hampson, 1908
- Nacoleia nomangara Viette, 1981
- Nacoleia ochrimarginalis Marion, 1954
- Nacoleia progonialis Hampson, 1899
- Nacoleia pulveralis Marion, 1954
- Nacoleia salomonalis T. B. Fletcher, 1910
- Nacoleia tampiusalis (Walker, 1859)
- Nacoleia tumidicostalis Hampson, 1908
