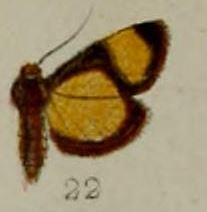
- Lamprosema semicostalis

Scientific classification
- Domain: Eukaryota
- Kingdom: Animalia
- Phylum: Arthropoda
- Class: Insecta
- Order: Lepidoptera
- Family: Crambidae
- Tribe: Hydririni
- Genus: Lamprosema; Hübner, 1823

Synonyms
- Lamphosema Schaus, 1940; Orocala Walker, 1866

= Lamprosema =

Genus of moths

Lamprosema is a genus of moths of the family Crambidae described by Jacob Hübner in 1823.

== Species ==
- Lamprosema alicialis Schaus, 1927
- Lamprosema alphalis (Viette, 1958)
- Lamprosema anaemicalis Hampson, 1918
- Lamprosema angulinea (Schaus, 1913)
- Lamprosema argyropalis (Hampson, 1908)
- Lamprosema atsinana Viette, 1989
- Lamprosema aurantia Hampson, 1918
- Lamprosema aurantifascialis (Hampson, 1896)
- Lamprosema baracoalis Schaus, 1920
- Lamprosema biformis (Butler, 1889)
- Lamprosema bonitalis Schaus, 1927
- Lamprosema brunnealis Schaus, 1920
- Lamprosema brunnescens (Dyar, 1914)
- Lamprosema canacealis (Walker, 1859)
- Lamprosema caradocalis Schaus, 1927
- Lamprosema cayugalis Schaus, 1920
- Lamprosema chrysanthalis Hampson, 1918
- Lamprosema clausalis (Dognin, 1910)
- Lamprosema commixta (Butler, 1873)
- Lamprosema crocodora (Meyrick, 1934)
- Lamprosema cuprealis (Moore, 1877)
- Lamprosema cyanealis (Walker, 1859)
- Lamprosema didasalis (Walker, 1859)
- Lamprosema discalis Warren, 1896
- Lamprosema distentalis (Walker, 1866)
- Lamprosema distincta (Kaye, 1901)
- Lamprosema distinctifascia (Rothschild, 1916)
- Lamprosema dorisalis (Walker, 1859)
- Lamprosema esperanzalis (Schaus, 1912)
- Lamprosema excurvalis (Hampson, 1912)
- Lamprosema flaviterminalis Hampson, 1918
- Lamprosema flavizonalis Hampson, 1918
- Lamprosema foviferalis (Hampson, 1912)
- Lamprosema fusalis Warren, 1896
- Lamprosema fuscifimbrialis (Hampson, 1896)
- Lamprosema guttalis (Viette, 1958)
- Lamprosema haesitans (Meyrick, 1934)
- Lamprosema hebitare Whalley, 1962
- Lamprosema hoenei Caradja, 1932
- Lamprosema infuscalis (Hampson, 1904)
- Lamprosema inglorialis Hampson, 1918
- Lamprosema insulicola (T. B. Fletcher, 1922)
- Lamprosema kingdoni (Butler, 1879)
- Lamprosema ladonalis (Walker, 1859)
- Lamprosema lateritialis Hampson, 1918
- Lamprosema latinigralis (Hampson, 1899)
- Lamprosema leucopis Hampson, 1918
- Lamprosema lucillalis (Viette, 1958)
- Lamprosema lunulalis Hübner, 1823
- Lamprosema malticalis Schaus, 1920
- Lamprosema marionalis (Walker, 1859)
- Lamprosema memoralis Schaus, 1940
- Lamprosema moccalis Schaus, 1920
- Lamprosema nannalis (Dyar, 1914)
- Lamprosema nigricostalis (Hampson, 1908)
- Lamprosema niphealis (Walker, 1859)
- Lamprosema niphosemalis Hampson, 1918
- Lamprosema noctalis Schaus, 1920
- Lamprosema nomangara (Viette, 1981)
- Lamprosema ochrimarginalis (Marion, 1954)
- Lamprosema oeaxalis (Walker, 1859)
- Lamprosema oediproctalis Hampson, 1918
- Lamprosema oxiperalis (Hampson, 1912)
- Lamprosema pectinalis Hampson, 1918
- Lamprosema pelealis (Walker, 1859)
- Lamprosema phaleasalis (Walker, 1859)
- Lamprosema platyproctalis Hampson, 1918
- Lamprosema pogonotornalis Hampson, 1918
- Lamprosema polysemalis (Hampson, 1897)
- Lamprosema pulveralis (Marion, 1954)
- Lamprosema rakotalis (Viette, 1958)
- Lamprosema rubricetalis (Snellen, 1880)
- Lamprosema salomonalis (T. B. Fletcher, 1910)
- Lamprosema santialis Schaus, 1920
- Lamprosema semicostalis (Hampson, 1899)
- Lamprosema sibirialis (Millière, 1879)
- Lamprosema silvosalis (Swinhoe, 1906)
- Lamprosema sinaloanensis Dyar, 1923
- Lamprosema tampiusalis (Walker, 1859)
- Lamprosema tienmushanus Caradja & Meyrick, 1935
- Lamprosema tumidicostalis (Hampson, 1908)
- Lamprosema variospilalis (Dognin, 1908)
- Lamprosema victoriae Dyar, 1923

== Former species ==
- Lamprosema charesalis (Walker, 1859)
- Lamprosema immundalis (South in Leech & South, 1901)
