= Lamprosema guttalis =

Scientific classification
- Kingdom: Animalia
- Phylum: Arthropoda
- Class: Insecta
- Order: Lepidoptera
- Family: Crambidae
- Genus: Lamprosema
- Species: L. guttalis

Binomial name
- Lamprosema guttalis Viette, 1958

Synonyms
- Nacoleia guttalis Viette, 1958

Species of moth

Lamprosema guttalis is a species of moth of the family Crambidae described by Pierre Viette in 1958. It can be found in Madagascar.

Its wingspan is 27–28 mm, with a length of the forewings of 13–14 mm. This species looks close to Lamprosema kingdoni (Butler, 1879).

The holotype had been collected in 1955 near Périnet (Analamazoatra Reserve).
