= Symphonia (moth) =

Scientific classification
- Domain: Eukaryota
- Kingdom: Animalia
- Phylum: Arthropoda
- Class: Insecta
- Order: Lepidoptera
- Family: Crambidae
- Subfamily: Acentropinae
- Genus: Symphonia; Hampson, 1896

Genus of moths

Symphonia is a genus of moths of the family Crambidae.

== Species ==
- Symphonia albioculalis Hampson, 1906
- Symphonia leucostictalis Hampson, 1906
- Symphonia marionalis Viette, 1958
- Symphonia multipictalis Hampson, 1896 (from Sri Lanka)
- Symphonia nymphulalis Marion & Viette, 1956 (from Madagascar)

== Former species ==
- Symphonia secunda Strand, 1919
- Symphonia trivitralis (Warren, 1895)
