= Nacoleia acyperalis =

Scientific classification
- Kingdom: Animalia
- Phylum: Arthropoda
- Clade: Pancrustacea
- Class: Insecta
- Order: Lepidoptera
- Family: Crambidae
- Genus: Nacoleia
- Species: N. acyperalis

Binomial name
- Nacoleia acyperalis Hampson, 1912

Species of moth

Nacoleia acyperalis is a moth in the family Crambidae. It was described by George Hampson in 1912. It is found in Nigeria.
