= Nacoleia lunidiscalis =

Scientific classification
- Kingdom: Animalia
- Phylum: Arthropoda
- Clade: Pancrustacea
- Class: Insecta
- Order: Lepidoptera
- Family: Crambidae
- Genus: Nacoleia
- Species: N. lunidiscalis

Binomial name
- Nacoleia lunidiscalis Hampson, 1898

Species of moth

Nacoleia lunidiscalis is a moth in the family Crambidae. It was described by George Hampson in 1898. It is found in Ghana.
