= Lamprosema cuprealis =

Scientific classification
- Domain: Eukaryota
- Kingdom: Animalia
- Phylum: Arthropoda
- Class: Insecta
- Order: Lepidoptera
- Family: Crambidae
- Genus: Lamprosema
- Species: L. cuprealis

Binomial name
- Lamprosema cuprealis (Moore, 1877)

Synonyms
- Coptobasis cuprealis Moore, 1877

Species of moth

Lamprosema cuprealis is a moth in the family Crambidae. It was described by Frederic Moore in 1877. It is found on the Andamans.
