= Lamprosema pectinalis =

Scientific classification
- Kingdom: Animalia
- Phylum: Arthropoda
- Class: Insecta
- Order: Lepidoptera
- Family: Crambidae
- Genus: Lamprosema
- Species: L. pectinalis

Binomial name
- Lamprosema pectinalis Hampson, 1918

Species of moth

Lamprosema pectinalis is a moth in the family Crambidae. It was described by George Hampson in 1918. It is found in China.
