= Lamprosema variospilalis =

Scientific classification
- Domain: Eukaryota
- Kingdom: Animalia
- Phylum: Arthropoda
- Class: Insecta
- Order: Lepidoptera
- Family: Crambidae
- Genus: Lamprosema
- Species: L. variospilalis

Binomial name
- Lamprosema variospilalis (Dognin, 1908)

Synonyms
- Nacoleia variospilalis Dognin, 1908

Species of moth

Lamprosema variospilalis is a moth in the family Crambidae that is found in Peru. It was described by Paul Dognin in 1908.
