= Lamprosema brunnescens =

Scientific classification
- Kingdom: Animalia
- Phylum: Arthropoda
- Class: Insecta
- Order: Lepidoptera
- Family: Crambidae
- Genus: Lamprosema
- Species: L. brunnescens

Binomial name
- Lamprosema brunnescens (Dyar, 1914)

Synonyms
- Nacoleia brunnescens Dyar, 1914

Species of moth

Lamprosema brunnescens is a moth in the family Crambidae. It was described by Harrison Gray Dyar Jr. in 1914. It is found in Panama.
