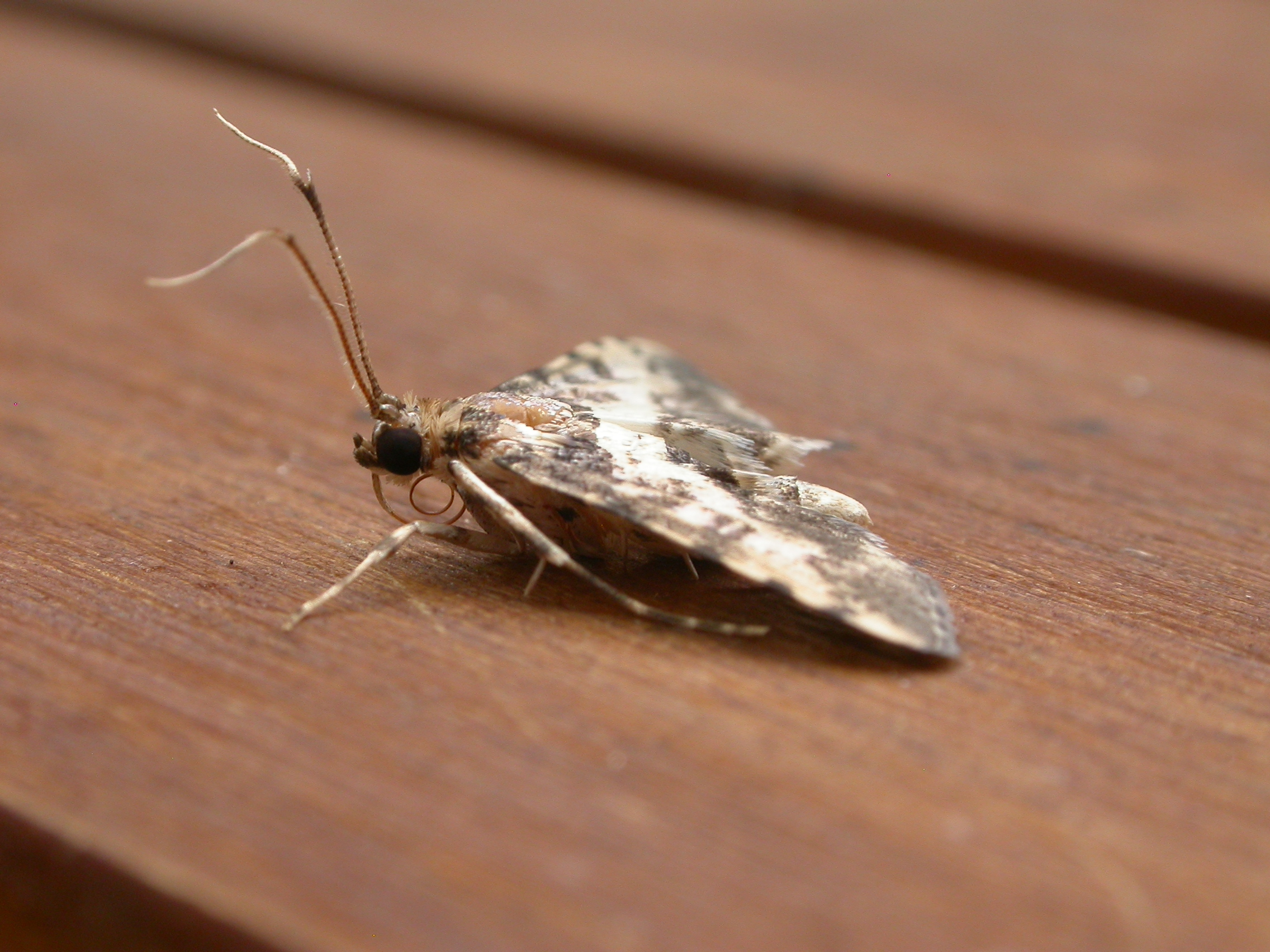

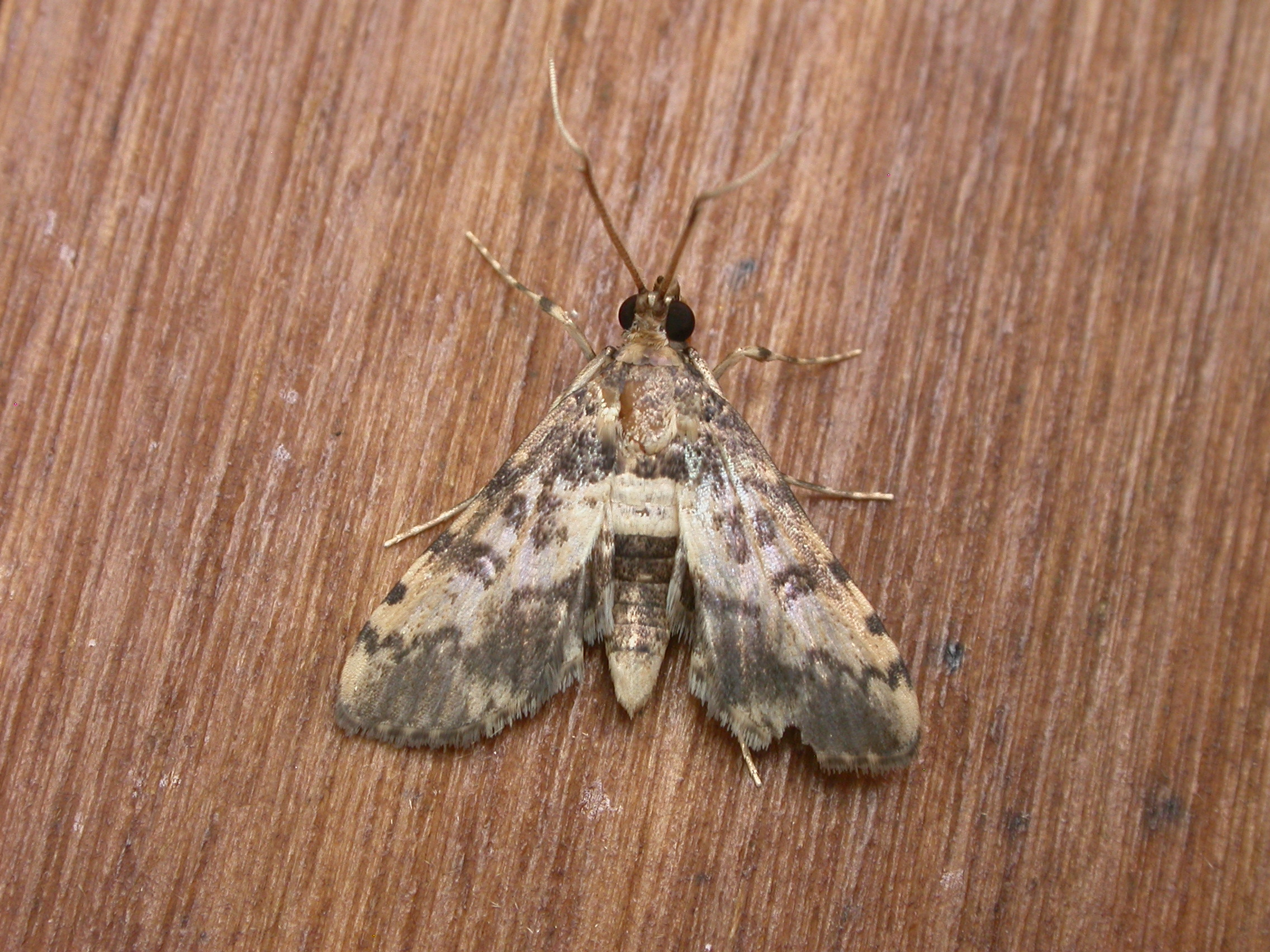

Scientific classification
- Kingdom: Animalia
- Phylum: Arthropoda
- Clade: Pancrustacea
- Class: Insecta
- Order: Lepidoptera
- Family: Crambidae
- Genus: Nacoleia
- Species: N. amphicedalis

Binomial name
- Nacoleia amphicedalis (Walker, 1859)

Synonyms
- Salbia amphicedalis Walker, 1859; Isopteryx bilunatalis Walker, 1866

= Nacoleia amphicedalis =

Species of moth

Nacoleia amphicedalis is a species of moth of the family Crambidae described by Francis Walker in 1859. It is found in Australia (Queensland and New South Wales).
