= Lamprosema infuscalis =

Scientific classification
- Kingdom: Animalia
- Phylum: Arthropoda
- Class: Insecta
- Order: Lepidoptera
- Family: Crambidae
- Genus: Lamprosema
- Species: L. infuscalis

Binomial name
- Lamprosema infuscalis (Hampson, 1904)

Synonyms
- Nacoleia infuscalis Hampson, 1904

Species of moth

Lamprosema infuscalis is a moth in the family Crambidae. It was described by George Hampson in 1904. It is found on the Bahamas.
