= Lamprosema cyanealis =

Scientific classification
- Kingdom: Animalia
- Phylum: Arthropoda
- Class: Insecta
- Order: Lepidoptera
- Family: Crambidae
- Genus: Lamprosema
- Species: L. cyanealis

Binomial name
- Lamprosema cyanealis (Walker, 1859)

Synonyms
- Isopteryx cyanealis Walker, 1859

Species of moth

Lamprosema cyanealis is a moth in the family Crambidae. It was described by Francis Walker in 1859. It is found on Borneo.
