= Nacoleia rubralis =

Scientific classification
- Kingdom: Animalia
- Phylum: Arthropoda
- Clade: Pancrustacea
- Class: Insecta
- Order: Lepidoptera
- Family: Crambidae
- Genus: Nacoleia
- Species: N. rubralis

Binomial name
- Nacoleia rubralis Hampson, 1898

Synonyms
- Coptobasoides rubralis

Species of moth

Nacoleia rubralis is a moth in the family Crambidae. It was described by George Hampson in 1898. It is found in Madagascar.
