= Lamprosema lateritialis =

Scientific classification
- Kingdom: Animalia
- Phylum: Arthropoda
- Class: Insecta
- Order: Lepidoptera
- Family: Crambidae
- Genus: Lamprosema
- Species: L. lateritialis

Binomial name
- Lamprosema lateritialis Hampson, 1918

Species of moth

Lamprosema lateritialis is a moth in the family Crambidae. It was described by George Hampson in 1918. It is found in Ghana and Malawi.

The larvae have been recorded feeding on Pericopsis elata.
