= Nacoleia inouei =

Scientific classification
- Kingdom: Animalia
- Phylum: Arthropoda
- Clade: Pancrustacea
- Class: Insecta
- Order: Lepidoptera
- Family: Crambidae
- Genus: Nacoleia
- Species: N. inouei

Binomial name
- Nacoleia inouei Yamanaka, 1980

Species of moth

Nacoleia inouei is a moth in the family Crambidae. It was described by Hiroshi Yamanaka in 1980. It is found in Japan and Korea.

Adults are on wing in August in Japan.
