= Lamprosema silvosalis =

Scientific classification
- Domain: Eukaryota
- Kingdom: Animalia
- Phylum: Arthropoda
- Class: Insecta
- Order: Lepidoptera
- Family: Crambidae
- Genus: Lamprosema
- Species: L. silvosalis

Binomial name
- Lamprosema silvosalis (C. Swinhoe, 1906)

Synonyms
- Pyrausta silvosalis C. Swinhoe, 1906

Species of moth

Lamprosema silvosalis is a moth in the family Crambidae. It was described by Charles Swinhoe in 1906. It is found in Meghalaya, India.
