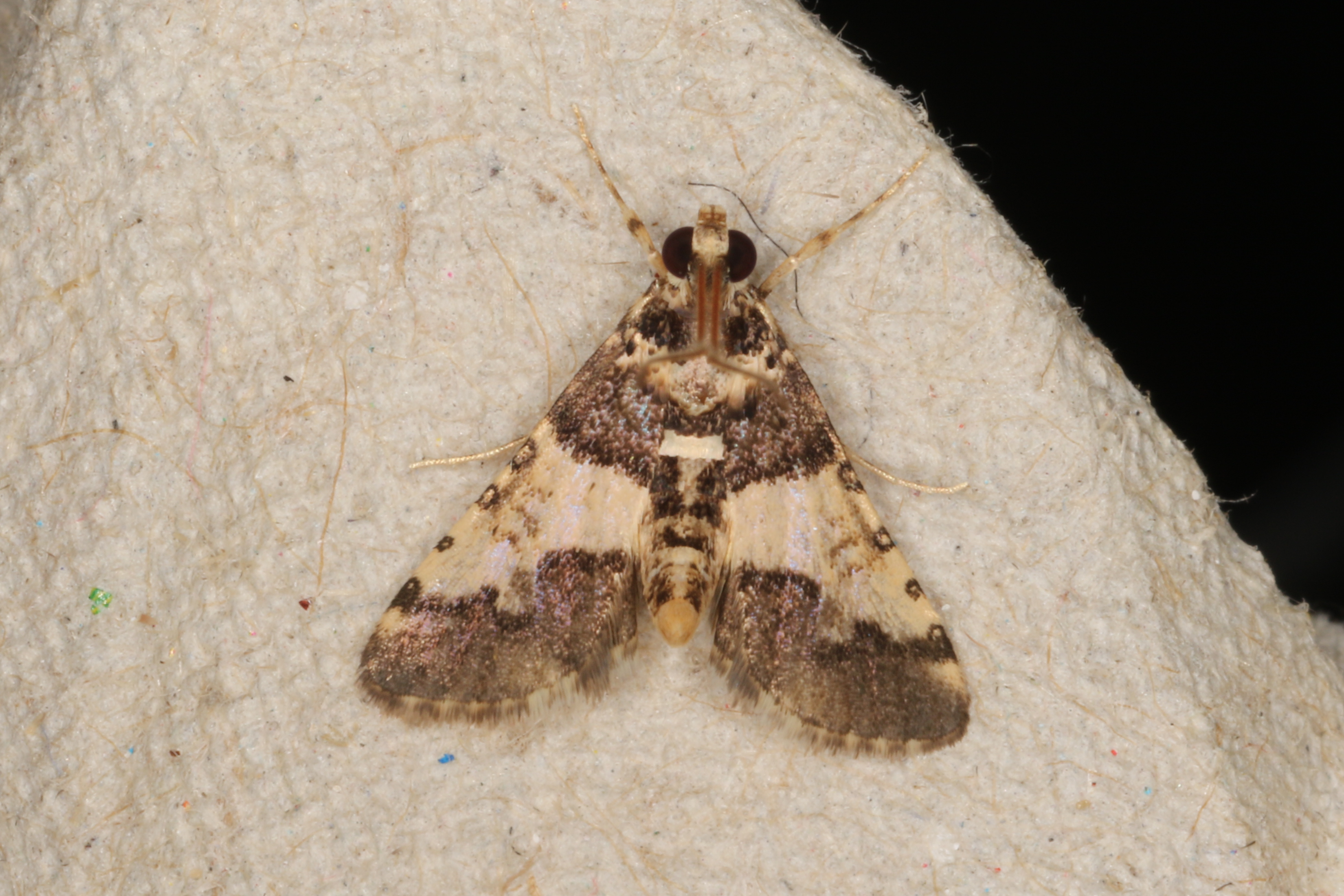
- Aranda, Australian Capital Territory

Scientific classification
- Kingdom: Animalia
- Phylum: Arthropoda
- Clade: Pancrustacea
- Class: Insecta
- Order: Lepidoptera
- Family: Crambidae
- Genus: Nacoleia
- Species: N. mesochlora

Binomial name
- Nacoleia mesochlora (Meyrick, 1884)

Synonyms
- Deuterarcha mesochlora Meyrick, 1884; Endotricha annuligera Butler, 1886

= Nacoleia mesochlora =

Species of moth

Nacoleia mesochlora is a moth in the family Crambidae. It was described by Edward Meyrick in 1884. It is found in Australia, where it has been recorded from Queensland, the Northern Territory, New South Wales, Victoria, South Australia and Western Australia.

The wingspan is 14–16 mm. The forewings are pale dull whitish ochreous. The first line is straight, thick and blackish, from one-third of the costa to two-fifths of the inner margin. The basal area up to this line is rather dark fuscous. The second line is thick, blackish and runs from three-fourths of the costa to beyond the middle of the inner margin. The hind-marginal area beyond this line is rather dark fuscous and there is a cloudy fuscous discal spot, as well as three small semicircular blackish-fuscous centred marks on the costa between first and second lines. The hindwings are pale ochreous yellow, with a broad rather dark fuscous hind-marginal band.
