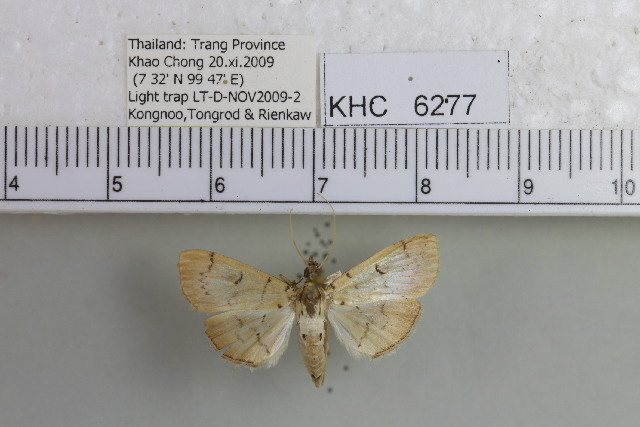

Scientific classification
- Kingdom: Animalia
- Phylum: Arthropoda
- Clade: Pancrustacea
- Class: Insecta
- Order: Lepidoptera
- Family: Crambidae
- Genus: Nacoleia
- Species: N. insolitalis

Binomial name
- Nacoleia insolitalis Walker, 1862

= Nacoleia insolitalis =

Species of moth

Nacoleia insolitalis is a moth in the family, Crambidae. It was described by Francis Walker in 1862. It is found in Indonesia and Thailand.
