= Lamprosema hoenei =

Scientific classification
- Kingdom: Animalia
- Phylum: Arthropoda
- Clade: Pancrustacea
- Class: Insecta
- Order: Lepidoptera
- Family: Crambidae
- Genus: Lamprosema
- Species: L. hoenei

Binomial name
- Lamprosema hoenei Caradja, 1932

Species of moth

Lamprosema hoenei is a moth in the family Crambidae. It was described by Aristide Caradja in 1932. It is found in China.
