= Lamprosema memoralis =

Scientific classification
- Domain: Eukaryota
- Kingdom: Animalia
- Phylum: Arthropoda
- Class: Insecta
- Order: Lepidoptera
- Family: Crambidae
- Genus: Lamprosema
- Species: L. memoralis

Binomial name
- Lamprosema memoralis (Schaus, 1940)

Species of moth

Lamprosema memoralis is a moth in the family Crambidae. It was described by Schaus in 1940. It is found in Puerto Rico.
