= Lamprosema baracoalis =

Scientific classification
- Domain: Eukaryota
- Kingdom: Animalia
- Phylum: Arthropoda
- Class: Insecta
- Order: Lepidoptera
- Family: Crambidae
- Genus: Lamprosema
- Species: L. baracoalis

Binomial name
- Lamprosema baracoalis Schaus, 1920

Species of moth

Lamprosema baracoalis is a moth in the family Crambidae. It was described by Schaus in 1920. It is found in Cuba.
