= Nacoleia eximialis =

Scientific classification
- Kingdom: Animalia
- Phylum: Arthropoda
- Clade: Pancrustacea
- Class: Insecta
- Order: Lepidoptera
- Family: Crambidae
- Genus: Nacoleia
- Species: N. eximialis

Binomial name
- Nacoleia eximialis (Warren, 1896)

Synonyms
- Thysanodesma eximialis Warren, 1896

Species of moth

Nacoleia eximialis is a moth in the family Crambidae. It was described by Warren in 1896. It is found in India (Meghalaya).
