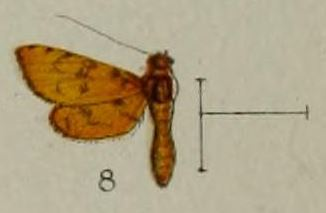

Scientific classification
- Domain: Eukaryota
- Kingdom: Animalia
- Phylum: Arthropoda
- Class: Insecta
- Order: Lepidoptera
- Family: Crambidae
- Subfamily: Pyraustinae
- Genus: Preneopogon; Warren, 1896

= Preneopogon =

Genus of moths

Preneopogon is a genus of moths of the family Crambidae.

== Species ==
- Preneopogon barbata Warren, 1896
- Preneopogon catenalis (Wileman, 1911)
- Preneopogon progonialis (Hampson, 1898)
