= Nacoleia distinctalis =

Scientific classification
- Kingdom: Animalia
- Phylum: Arthropoda
- Clade: Pancrustacea
- Class: Insecta
- Order: Lepidoptera
- Family: Crambidae
- Genus: Nacoleia
- Species: N. distinctalis

Binomial name
- Nacoleia distinctalis Rothschild, 1915

Species of moth

Nacoleia distinctalis is a moth in the family Crambidae. It was described by Rothschild in 1915. It is found in Papua New Guinea.
