= Preneopogon barbata =

Scientific classification
- Domain: Eukaryota
- Kingdom: Animalia
- Phylum: Arthropoda
- Class: Insecta
- Order: Lepidoptera
- Family: Crambidae
- Genus: Preneopogon
- Species: P. barbata

Binomial name
- Preneopogon barbata Warren, 1896

Species of moth

Preneopogon barbata is a moth in the family Crambidae. It was described by Warren in 1896. It is found in the Khasia Hills in India.
