= Nacoleia gressitti =

Scientific classification
- Kingdom: Animalia
- Phylum: Arthropoda
- Clade: Pancrustacea
- Class: Insecta
- Order: Lepidoptera
- Family: Crambidae
- Genus: Nacoleia
- Species: N. gressitti

Binomial name
- Nacoleia gressitti Inoue, 1996

Species of moth

Nacoleia gressitti is a moth in the family Crambidae. It was described by Hiroshi Inoue in 1996. It is found in Japan, where it has been recorded from the Ogasawara Islands.
