= Nacoleia attenualis =

Scientific classification
- Kingdom: Animalia
- Phylum: Arthropoda
- Clade: Pancrustacea
- Class: Insecta
- Order: Lepidoptera
- Family: Crambidae
- Genus: Nacoleia
- Species: N. attenualis

Binomial name
- Nacoleia attenualis Hampson, 1912

Species of moth

Nacoleia attenualis is a moth in the family Crambidae. It was described by George Hampson in 1912. It is found in Kenya.
