= Lamprosema angulinea =

Scientific classification
- Domain: Eukaryota
- Kingdom: Animalia
- Phylum: Arthropoda
- Class: Insecta
- Order: Lepidoptera
- Family: Crambidae
- Genus: Lamprosema
- Species: L. angulinea

Binomial name
- Lamprosema angulinea (Schaus, 1913)

Synonyms
- Nacoleia angulinea Schaus, 1913

Species of moth

Lamprosema angulinea is a moth in the family Crambidae. It was described by Schaus in 1913. It is found in Costa Rica.
