= Lamprosema aurantifascialis =

Scientific classification
- Kingdom: Animalia
- Phylum: Arthropoda
- Class: Insecta
- Order: Lepidoptera
- Family: Crambidae
- Genus: Lamprosema
- Species: L. aurantifascialis

Binomial name
- Lamprosema aurantifascialis (Hampson, 1896)

Synonyms
- Nacoleia aurantifascialis Hampson, 1896

Species of moth

Lamprosema aurantifascialis is a moth in the family Crambidae. It was described by George Hampson in 1896. It is found in India.
