= Nacoleia perstygialis =

Scientific classification
- Kingdom: Animalia
- Phylum: Arthropoda
- Clade: Pancrustacea
- Class: Insecta
- Order: Lepidoptera
- Family: Crambidae
- Genus: Nacoleia
- Species: N. perstygialis

Binomial name
- Nacoleia perstygialis Hampson, 1912

Species of moth

Nacoleia perstygialis is a moth in the family Crambidae. It was described by George Hampson in 1912. It is found in Hubei, China, but has also been recorded from Costa Rica.
