= Preneopogon catenalis =

Scientific classification
- Domain: Eukaryota
- Kingdom: Animalia
- Phylum: Arthropoda
- Class: Insecta
- Order: Lepidoptera
- Family: Crambidae
- Genus: Preneopogon
- Species: P. catenalis

Binomial name
- Preneopogon catenalis (Wileman, 1911)

Synonyms
- Nacoleia catenalis Wileman, 1911

Species of moth

Preneopogon catenalis is a moth in the family Crambidae. It was described by Wileman in 1911. It is found in Japan and Taiwan.
