= Nacoleia junctithyralis =

Scientific classification
- Kingdom: Animalia
- Phylum: Arthropoda
- Clade: Pancrustacea
- Class: Insecta
- Order: Lepidoptera
- Family: Crambidae
- Genus: Nacoleia
- Species: N. junctithyralis

Binomial name
- Nacoleia junctithyralis Hampson, 1898

Species of moth

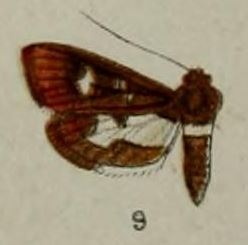
Nacoleia junctithyralis Hampson, 1898

Nacoleia junctithyralis is a moth in the family Crambidae. It was described by George Hampson in 1898. It is found in Papua New Guinea, where it has been recorded from the D'Entrecasteaux Islands (Fergusson Island).
