= Lamprosema crocodora =

Scientific classification
- Kingdom: Animalia
- Phylum: Arthropoda
- Class: Insecta
- Order: Lepidoptera
- Family: Crambidae
- Genus: Lamprosema
- Species: L. crocodora

Binomial name
- Lamprosema crocodora (Meyrick, 1934)

Synonyms
- Conogethes crocodora Meyrick, 1934; Dichocrocis crocodora

Species of moth

Lamprosema crocodora is a moth in the family Crambidae. It was described by Edward Meyrick in 1934. It is found in the Democratic Republic of the Congo (Equateur, East Kasai, Orientale, Bas Congo).

The larvae feed on Coffea species, including Coffea liberica and Coffea arabica.
