= Lamprosema ladonalis =

Scientific classification
- Kingdom: Animalia
- Phylum: Arthropoda
- Class: Insecta
- Order: Lepidoptera
- Family: Crambidae
- Genus: Lamprosema
- Species: L. ladonalis

Binomial name
- Lamprosema ladonalis (Walker, 1859)

Synonyms
- Nacoleia ladonalis Walker, 1859; Botys ladonalis

Species of moth

Lamprosema ladonalis is a moth in the family Crambidae. It was described by Francis Walker in 1859. It is found in western Africa.
