= Nacoleia defloralis =

Scientific classification
- Kingdom: Animalia
- Phylum: Arthropoda
- Clade: Pancrustacea
- Class: Insecta
- Order: Lepidoptera
- Family: Crambidae
- Genus: Nacoleia
- Species: N. defloralis

Binomial name
- Nacoleia defloralis (Snellen, 1880)

Synonyms
- Botys defloralis Snellen, 1880

Species of moth

Nacoleia defloralis is a moth in the family Crambidae. It was described by Snellen in 1880. It is found in Indonesia, where it has been recorded from Sulawesi.
