= Lamprosema anaemicalis =

Scientific classification
- Kingdom: Animalia
- Phylum: Arthropoda
- Class: Insecta
- Order: Lepidoptera
- Family: Crambidae
- Genus: Lamprosema
- Species: L. anaemicalis

Binomial name
- Lamprosema anaemicalis Hampson, 1918

Species of moth

Lamprosema anaemicalis is a moth in the family Crambidae. It was described by George Hampson in 1918. It is found in Peru.
