= Lamprosema nannalis =

Scientific classification
- Domain: Eukaryota
- Kingdom: Animalia
- Phylum: Arthropoda
- Class: Insecta
- Order: Lepidoptera
- Family: Crambidae
- Genus: Lamprosema
- Species: L. nannalis

Binomial name
- Lamprosema nannalis (Dyar, 1914)

Synonyms
- Nacoleia nannalis Dyar, 1914

Species of moth

Lamprosema nannalis is a moth in the family Crambidae. It was described by Harrison Gray Dyar Jr. in 1914. It is found in Panama.
