= Lamprosema pelealis =

Scientific classification
- Kingdom: Animalia
- Phylum: Arthropoda
- Class: Insecta
- Order: Lepidoptera
- Family: Crambidae
- Genus: Lamprosema
- Species: L. pelealis

Binomial name
- Lamprosema pelealis (Walker, 1859)

Synonyms
- Desmia pelealis Walker, 1859

Species of moth

Lamprosema pelealis is a moth in the family Crambidae. It was described by Francis Walker in 1859. It is found in the Dominican Republic, Brazil and Venezuela.
