= Lamprosema leucopis =

Scientific classification
- Kingdom: Animalia
- Phylum: Arthropoda
- Class: Insecta
- Order: Lepidoptera
- Family: Crambidae
- Genus: Lamprosema
- Species: L. leucopis

Binomial name
- Lamprosema leucopis Hampson, 1918

Species of moth

Lamprosema leucopis is a moth in the family Crambidae. It was described by George Hampson in 1918. It is found on New Guinea.
