= Nacoleia obliqualis =

Scientific classification
- Kingdom: Animalia
- Phylum: Arthropoda
- Clade: Pancrustacea
- Class: Insecta
- Order: Lepidoptera
- Family: Crambidae
- Genus: Nacoleia
- Species: N. obliqualis

Binomial name
- Nacoleia obliqualis Hampson, 1898

Species of moth

Nacoleia obliqualis is a moth in the family Crambidae. It was described by George Hampson in 1898. It is found in Australia, where it has been recorded from Queensland.

Adults are brown with dark patches at the margin and the base of the wings.
