= Symphonia leucostictalis =

Scientific classification
- Kingdom: Animalia
- Phylum: Arthropoda
- Class: Insecta
- Order: Lepidoptera
- Family: Crambidae
- Genus: Symphonia
- Species: S. leucostictalis

Binomial name
- Symphonia leucostictalis Hampson, 1906

Species of moth

Symphonia leucostictalis is a species of moth in the family Crambidae. It was described by George Hampson in 1906. It is found on New Guinea.
