= Nacoleia oncophragma =

Scientific classification
- Kingdom: Animalia
- Phylum: Arthropoda
- Clade: Pancrustacea
- Class: Insecta
- Order: Lepidoptera
- Family: Crambidae
- Genus: Nacoleia
- Species: N. oncophragma

Binomial name
- Nacoleia oncophragma Turner, 1908

Species of moth

Nacoleia oncophragma is a moth in the family Crambidae. It was described by Turner in 1908. It is found in Australia, where it has been recorded from Queensland.

The wingspan is 22–25 mm. The forewings are fuscous, tinged with ochreous. The lines are darker fuscous. The hindwings are fuscous, towards the base sometimes whitish and there is an outwardly-curved fuscous line from the costa to the dorsum, as well as a finely dentate line from the costa, not reaching the dorsum.
