= Lamprosema bonitalis =

Scientific classification
- Domain: Eukaryota
- Kingdom: Animalia
- Phylum: Arthropoda
- Class: Insecta
- Order: Lepidoptera
- Family: Crambidae
- Genus: Lamprosema
- Species: L. bonitalis

Binomial name
- Lamprosema bonitalis Schaus, 1927

Species of moth

Lamprosema bonitalis is a moth in the family Crambidae. It was described by Schaus in 1927. It is found in the Philippines (Luzon).
