= Nacoleia fuscicilialis =

Scientific classification
- Kingdom: Animalia
- Phylum: Arthropoda
- Clade: Pancrustacea
- Class: Insecta
- Order: Lepidoptera
- Family: Crambidae
- Genus: Nacoleia
- Species: N. fuscicilialis

Binomial name
- Nacoleia fuscicilialis Hampson, 1908

Species of moth

Nacoleia fuscicilialis is a moth in the family Crambidae. It was described by George Hampson in 1908. It is found in Sikkim, India.
