= Nacoleia syngenica =

Scientific classification
- Kingdom: Animalia
- Phylum: Arthropoda
- Clade: Pancrustacea
- Class: Insecta
- Order: Lepidoptera
- Family: Crambidae
- Genus: Nacoleia
- Species: N. syngenica

Binomial name
- Nacoleia syngenica Turner, 1913

Species of moth

Nacoleia syngenica is a moth in the family Crambidae. It was described by Turner in 1913. It is found in Australia, where it has been recorded from Queensland. base. The lines are dark-fuscous.
