= Lamprosema haesitans =

Scientific classification
- Kingdom: Animalia
- Phylum: Arthropoda
- Class: Insecta
- Order: Lepidoptera
- Family: Crambidae
- Genus: Lamprosema
- Species: L. haesitans

Binomial name
- Lamprosema haesitans (Meyrick, 1934)

Synonyms
- Nacoleia haesitans Meyrick, 1934

Species of moth

Lamprosema haesitans is a moth in the family Crambidae. It was described by Edward Meyrick in 1934. It is found in the Democratic Republic of the Congo (Orientale, Equateur).
