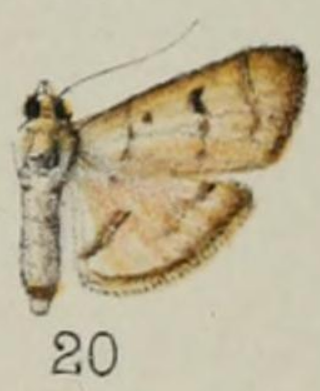
- 1901 illustration by E. C. Knight

Scientific classification
- Domain: Eukaryota
- Kingdom: Animalia
- Phylum: Arthropoda
- Class: Insecta
- Order: Lepidoptera
- Family: Crambidae
- Genus: Lamprosema
- Species: L. distincta

Binomial name
- Lamprosema distincta (Kaye, 1901)

Synonyms
- Pachyzancla distincta Kaye, 1901

= Lamprosema distincta =

Species of moth

Lamprosema distincta is a moth in the family Crambidae. It was described by William James Kaye in 1901. It is found in Trinidad.
