= Lamprosema distentalis =

Scientific classification
- Kingdom: Animalia
- Phylum: Arthropoda
- Class: Insecta
- Order: Lepidoptera
- Family: Crambidae
- Genus: Lamprosema
- Species: L. distentalis

Binomial name
- Lamprosema distentalis (Walker, 1866)

Synonyms
- Orocala distentalis Walker, 1866

Species of moth

Lamprosema distentalis is a species of moth of the family Crambidae. It was described by Hans Georg Amsel in 1866. It is found in Brazil.
