= Lamprosema excurvalis =

Scientific classification
- Kingdom: Animalia
- Phylum: Arthropoda
- Class: Insecta
- Order: Lepidoptera
- Family: Crambidae
- Genus: Lamprosema
- Species: L. excurvalis

Binomial name
- Lamprosema excurvalis (Hampson, 1912)

Synonyms
- Nacoleia excurvalis Hampson, 1912

Species of moth

Lamprosema excurvalis is a moth in the family Crambidae. It was described by George Hampson in 1912. It is found in Guatemala.
