= Symphonia multipictalis =

Scientific classification
- Kingdom: Animalia
- Phylum: Arthropoda
- Class: Insecta
- Order: Lepidoptera
- Family: Crambidae
- Genus: Symphonia
- Species: S. multipictalis

Binomial name
- Symphonia multipictalis Hampson, 1896

Species of moth

Symphonia multipictalis is a species of moth in the family Crambidae. It was described by George Hampson in 1896. It is found in Sri Lanka and on Java and Bali.
