= Nacoleia albiflavalis =

Scientific classification
- Kingdom: Animalia
- Phylum: Arthropoda
- Clade: Pancrustacea
- Class: Insecta
- Order: Lepidoptera
- Family: Crambidae
- Genus: Nacoleia
- Species: N. albiflavalis

Binomial name
- Nacoleia albiflavalis Hampson, 1903

Species of moth

Nacoleia albiflavalis is a moth in the family Crambidae. It was described by George Hampson in 1903. It is found in Sri Lanka and Indonesia (Sulawesi and Sumbawa).
