= Lamprosema flavizonalis =

Scientific classification
- Kingdom: Animalia
- Phylum: Arthropoda
- Class: Insecta
- Order: Lepidoptera
- Family: Crambidae
- Genus: Lamprosema
- Species: L. flavizonalis

Binomial name
- Lamprosema flavizonalis Hampson, 1918

Species of moth

Lamprosema flavizonalis is a moth in the family Crambidae. It was described by George Hampson in 1918. It is found in Western New Guinea, Indonesia.
