= Lamprosema polysemalis =

Scientific classification
- Kingdom: Animalia
- Phylum: Arthropoda
- Class: Insecta
- Order: Lepidoptera
- Family: Crambidae
- Genus: Lamprosema
- Species: L. polysemalis

Binomial name
- Lamprosema polysemalis (Hampson, 1897)

Synonyms
- Dasyscopa polysemalis Hampson, 1897

Species of moth

Lamprosema polysemalis is a moth in the family Crambidae. It was described by George Hampson in 1897. It is found on the Loyalty Islands in the south-west Pacific Ocean.
