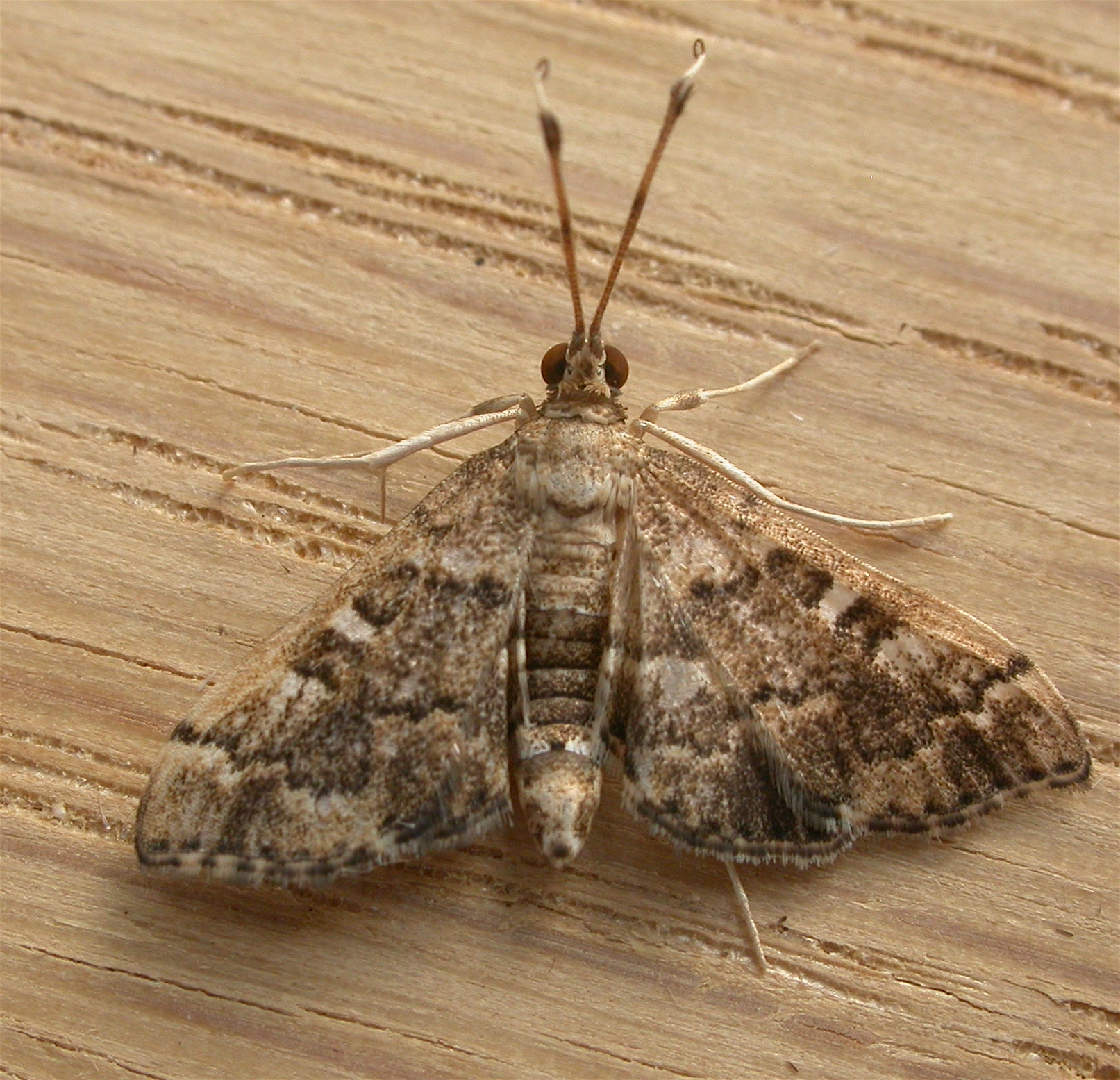

Scientific classification
- Kingdom: Animalia
- Phylum: Arthropoda
- Clade: Pancrustacea
- Class: Insecta
- Order: Lepidoptera
- Family: Crambidae
- Genus: Nacoleia
- Species: N. rhoeoalis

Binomial name
- Nacoleia rhoeoalis (Walker, 1859)

Synonyms
- Desmia rhoeoalis Walker, 1859; Nacoleia murcusalis Walker, 1859; Botys hypsidesalis Walker, 1859; Isopteryx sordidalis Walker, 1866; Samea distractalis Walker, 1869; Samea irruptalis Walker, 1866

= Nacoleia rhoeoalis =

Species of moth

Nacoleia rhoeoalis is a species of moth of the family Crambidae. It is found in New South Wales, Queensland, Victoria, Western Australia and Tasmania. The species was first described by Francis Walker in 1859.

The wingspan is about 10 mm.

The larvae feed on the dead leaves of Eucalyptus species.
