= Lamprosema victoriae =

Scientific classification
- Domain: Eukaryota
- Kingdom: Animalia
- Phylum: Arthropoda
- Class: Insecta
- Order: Lepidoptera
- Family: Crambidae
- Genus: Lamprosema
- Species: L. victoriae

Binomial name
- Lamprosema victoriae Dyar, 1923

Species of moth

Lamprosema victoriae is a moth in the family Crambidae. It was described by Harrison Gray Dyar Jr. in 1923. It has been recorded in the United States from Louisiana, Mississippi, Oklahoma and Texas.
