= Nacoleia ustalis =

Scientific classification
- Kingdom: Animalia
- Phylum: Arthropoda
- Clade: Pancrustacea
- Class: Insecta
- Order: Lepidoptera
- Family: Crambidae
- Genus: Nacoleia
- Species: N. ustalis

Binomial name
- Nacoleia ustalis (Hampson, 1891)

Synonyms
- Aplomastix ustalis Hampson, 1891

Species of moth

Nacoleia ustalis is a moth in the family Crambidae. It was described by George Hampson in 1891. It is found in India's Nilgiri Mountains.
