= Lamprosema lunulalis =

Scientific classification
- Kingdom: Animalia
- Phylum: Arthropoda
- Clade: Pancrustacea
- Class: Insecta
- Order: Lepidoptera
- Family: Crambidae
- Genus: Lamprosema
- Species: L. lunulalis

Binomial name
- Lamprosema lunulalis Hübner, 1823

Species of moth

Lamprosema lunulalis is a moth in the family Crambidae. It was described by Jacob Hübner in 1823. It is found in Suriname.
