= Nacoleia dizona =

Scientific classification
- Kingdom: Animalia
- Phylum: Arthropoda
- Clade: Pancrustacea
- Class: Insecta
- Order: Lepidoptera
- Family: Crambidae
- Genus: Nacoleia
- Species: N. dizona

Binomial name
- Nacoleia dizona Hampson, 1912

Synonyms
- Bradina fuliginosa Rothschild, 1915; Bradina grisealis Rothschild, 1915

Species of moth

Nacoleia dizona is a moth in the family Crambidae. It was described by George Hampson in 1912. It is found in Papua New Guinea.
