= Nacoleia chagosalis =

Scientific classification
- Kingdom: Animalia
- Phylum: Arthropoda
- Clade: Pancrustacea
- Class: Insecta
- Order: Lepidoptera
- Family: Crambidae
- Genus: Nacoleia
- Species: N. chagosalis

Binomial name
- Nacoleia chagosalis T. B. Fletcher, 1910

Species of moth

Nacoleia chagosalis is a moth in the family Crambidae. It was described by Thomas Bainbrigge Fletcher in 1910. It is found on the Chagos Archipelago in the Indian Ocean.
