= Nacoleia sordidalis =

Scientific classification
- Kingdom: Animalia
- Phylum: Arthropoda
- Clade: Pancrustacea
- Class: Insecta
- Order: Lepidoptera
- Family: Crambidae
- Genus: Nacoleia
- Species: N. sordidalis

Binomial name
- Nacoleia sordidalis Rothschild, 1915

Species of moth

Nacoleia sordidalis is a moth in the family Crambidae. It was described by Rothschild in 1915. It is found in Papua New Guinea.
