= Nacoleia allocosma =

Scientific classification
- Kingdom: Animalia
- Phylum: Arthropoda
- Clade: Pancrustacea
- Class: Insecta
- Order: Lepidoptera
- Family: Crambidae
- Genus: Nacoleia
- Species: N. allocosma

Binomial name
- Nacoleia allocosma (Meyrick, 1886)

Synonyms
- Semioceros allocosma Meyrick, 1886

Species of moth

Nacoleia allocosma is a moth in the family Crambidae. It was described by Edward Meyrick in 1886. It is found on Fiji.
