= Nacoleia puncticostalis =

Scientific classification
- Kingdom: Animalia
- Phylum: Arthropoda
- Clade: Pancrustacea
- Class: Insecta
- Order: Lepidoptera
- Family: Crambidae
- Genus: Nacoleia
- Species: N. puncticostalis

Binomial name
- Nacoleia puncticostalis Hampson, 1899

Species of moth

Nacoleia puncticostalis is a moth in the family Crambidae. It was described by George Hampson in 1899. It is found in Indonesia, where it has been recorded from the Maluku Islands (Batchian).
