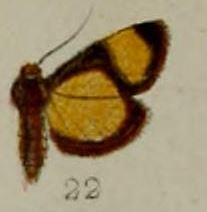

Scientific classification
- Kingdom: Animalia
- Phylum: Arthropoda
- Class: Insecta
- Order: Lepidoptera
- Family: Crambidae
- Genus: Lamprosema
- Species: L. semicostalis

Binomial name
- Lamprosema semicostalis (Hampson, 1899)

Synonyms
- Nacoleia semicostalis Hampson, 1899

= Lamprosema semicostalis =

Species of moth

Lamprosema semicostalis is a moth of the family Crambidae. It is found in Brazil.
