= Lamprosema alphalis =

Scientific classification
- Kingdom: Animalia
- Phylum: Arthropoda
- Class: Insecta
- Order: Lepidoptera
- Family: Crambidae
- Genus: Lamprosema
- Species: L. alphalis

Binomial name
- Lamprosema alphalis (Viette, 1958)

Synonyms
- Nacoleia alphalis Viette, 1958

Species of moth

Lamprosema alphalis is a species of moth of the family Crambidae described by Pierre Viette in 1958. It can be found in Madagascar.

Its wingspan is 17–18 mm, with a length of the forewings of 8-8.5 mm.

This species looks close to Dichocrocis alluaudalis but is considerably smaller. The holotype had been collected in western Madagascar, 45 km south of Morondava
