= Nacoleia aurealis =

Scientific classification
- Kingdom: Animalia
- Phylum: Arthropoda
- Clade: Pancrustacea
- Class: Insecta
- Order: Lepidoptera
- Family: Crambidae
- Genus: Nacoleia
- Species: N. aurealis

Binomial name
- Nacoleia aurealis Gaede, 1916

Species of moth

Nacoleia aurealis is a moth in the family Crambidae. It was described by Max Gaede in 1916. It is found in Cameroon.
