= Lamprosema rakotalis =

Scientific classification
- Kingdom: Animalia
- Phylum: Arthropoda
- Class: Insecta
- Order: Lepidoptera
- Family: Crambidae
- Genus: Lamprosema
- Species: L. rakotalis

Binomial name
- Lamprosema rakotalis Viette, 1958

Synonyms
- Hedylepta rakotalis Viette, 1958

Species of moth

Lamprosema rakotalis is a species of moth of the family Crambidae described by Pierre Viette in 1958. It can be found in Madagascar.

Its wingspan is 21–22 mm, with a length of the forewings of 10-10.5 mm.

The holotype had been collected in western Madagascar, 45 km south of Morondava.
