= Lamprosema oxiperalis =

Scientific classification
- Kingdom: Animalia
- Phylum: Arthropoda
- Class: Insecta
- Order: Lepidoptera
- Family: Crambidae
- Genus: Lamprosema
- Species: L. oxiperalis

Binomial name
- Lamprosema oxiperalis (Hampson, 1912)

Synonyms
- Nacoleia oxiperalis Hampson, 1912

Species of moth

Lamprosema oxiperalis is a moth in the family Crambidae. It was described by George Hampson in 1912. It is found on Jamaica.
