= Nacoleia alincia =

Scientific classification
- Kingdom: Animalia
- Phylum: Arthropoda
- Clade: Pancrustacea
- Class: Insecta
- Order: Lepidoptera
- Family: Crambidae
- Genus: Nacoleia
- Species: N. alincia

Binomial name
- Nacoleia alincia Turner, 1908

Species of moth

Nacoleia alincia is a moth in the family Crambidae. It was described by Turner in 1908. It is found in Australia, where it has been recorded from Queensland.

The wingspan is about 15-20 mm. The forewings are whitish, generally suffused with fuscous, especially towards the costa. There is a fuscous fascia near the base, succeeded by a fine transverse line and fuscous dots in the disc and at the middle. There are also two fuscous dots on the apical part of the costa, from the second proceeds an inwardly oblique, slightly dentate line, strongly bent outwards in the disc, and again inwards, ending on the dorsum. The hindwings are as the forewings, but without the basal lines and with only one discal spot. The postmedian line is interrupted in the middle.
