= Nacoleia parapsephis =

Scientific classification
- Kingdom: Animalia
- Phylum: Arthropoda
- Clade: Pancrustacea
- Class: Insecta
- Order: Lepidoptera
- Family: Crambidae
- Genus: Nacoleia
- Species: N. parapsephis

Binomial name
- Nacoleia parapsephis (Meyrick, 1887)

Synonyms
- Semioceros parapsephis Meyrick, 1887

Species of moth

Nacoleia parapsephis is a moth in the family Crambidae. It was described by Edward Meyrick in 1887. It is found on New Guinea and Australia, where it has been recorded from Queensland.

Adults are pale grey or brown with irregular dark-edged areas across the wings.
