= Nacoleia tricrossa =

Scientific classification
- Kingdom: Animalia
- Phylum: Arthropoda
- Clade: Pancrustacea
- Class: Insecta
- Order: Lepidoptera
- Family: Crambidae
- Genus: Nacoleia
- Species: N. tricrossa

Binomial name
- Nacoleia tricrossa (Meyrick, 1886)

Synonyms
- Semioceros tricrossa Meyrick, 1886

Species of moth

Nacoleia tricrossa is a moth in the family Crambidae. It was described by Edward Meyrick in 1886. It is found on New Guinea.
