= Lamprosema foviferalis =

Scientific classification
- Kingdom: Animalia
- Phylum: Arthropoda
- Class: Insecta
- Order: Lepidoptera
- Family: Crambidae
- Genus: Lamprosema
- Species: L. foviferalis

Binomial name
- Lamprosema foviferalis (Hampson, 1912)

Synonyms
- Nacoleia foviferalis Hampson, 1912; Nacoleia fofiveralis Amsel, 1956

Species of moth

Lamprosema foviferalis is a moth in the family Crambidae. It was described by George Hampson in 1912. It is found in Paraguay.
