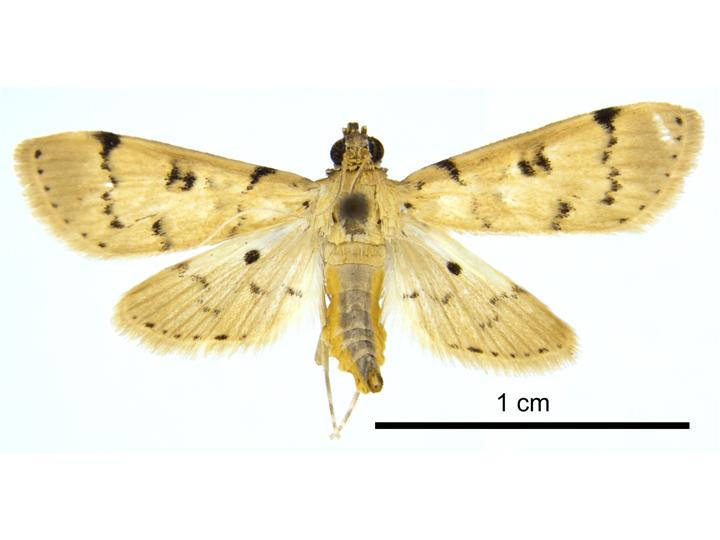

Scientific classification
- Kingdom: Animalia
- Phylum: Arthropoda
- Class: Insecta
- Order: Lepidoptera
- Family: Crambidae
- Genus: Nacoleia
- Species: N. octasema

Binomial name
- Nacoleia octasema (Meyrick, 1886)

Synonyms
- Notarcha octasema Meyrick, 1886; Hedylepta octasema; Lamprosema octasema; Omiodes octasema

= Nacoleia octasema =

Species of moth

Nacoleia octasema, the banana scab moth, is a moth in the family Crambidae. It was described by Edward Meyrick in 1886. It is found on Vanuatu and in Indonesia, New Guinea, the Solomon Islands, New Caledonia, Fiji, Tonga, Samoa and Australia, where it has been recorded from Queensland.
