= Nacoleia megaspilalis =

Scientific classification
- Kingdom: Animalia
- Phylum: Arthropoda
- Clade: Pancrustacea
- Class: Insecta
- Order: Lepidoptera
- Family: Crambidae
- Genus: Nacoleia
- Species: N. megaspilalis

Binomial name
- Nacoleia megaspilalis Hampson, 1912

Synonyms
- Nacoleia leucophrys Turner, 1926

Species of moth

Nacoleia megaspilalis is a moth in the family Crambidae. It was described by George Hampson in 1912. It is found in Andhra Pradesh in India and Queensland in Australia.

The wingspan is about 20 mm. The forewings are white with dark fuscous, somewhat suffused markings. The hindwings are as the forewings, but the basal patch is very small and there is no subbasal line, median fascia, subterminal line and there are also no costal rings.
