= Nacoleia sorosi =

Scientific classification
- Kingdom: Animalia
- Phylum: Arthropoda
- Clade: Pancrustacea
- Class: Insecta
- Order: Lepidoptera
- Family: Crambidae
- Genus: Nacoleia
- Species: N. sorosi

Binomial name
- Nacoleia sorosi Kirpichnikova, 1999

Species of moth

Nacoleia sorosi is a moth in the family Crambidae. It was described by Valentina A. Kirpichnikova in 1999. It is found in Primorsky Krai in the Russian Far East.
