= Lamprosema niphealis =

Scientific classification
- Kingdom: Animalia
- Phylum: Arthropoda
- Class: Insecta
- Order: Lepidoptera
- Family: Crambidae
- Genus: Lamprosema
- Species: L. niphealis

Binomial name
- Lamprosema niphealis (Walker, 1859)

Synonyms
- Botys niphealis Walker, 1859; Botys epastalis Swinhoe, 1885; Lamprosema niphealis ab. rufaurina Ghesquière, 1942

Species of moth

Lamprosema niphealis is a moth in the family Crambidae. It was described by Francis Walker in 1859. It is found in Africa.
