= Nacoleia satsumalis =

Scientific classification
- Kingdom: Animalia
- Phylum: Arthropoda
- Clade: Pancrustacea
- Class: Insecta
- Order: Lepidoptera
- Family: Crambidae
- Genus: Nacoleia
- Species: N. satsumalis

Binomial name
- Nacoleia satsumalis South in Leech & South, 1901

Species of moth

Nacoleia satsumalis is a moth in the family Crambidae. It was described by South in 1901. It is found in Japan and Korea.
