= Nacoleia albicilialis =

Scientific classification
- Kingdom: Animalia
- Phylum: Arthropoda
- Clade: Pancrustacea
- Class: Insecta
- Order: Lepidoptera
- Family: Crambidae
- Genus: Nacoleia
- Species: N. albicilialis

Binomial name
- Nacoleia albicilialis Hampson, 1903

Species of moth

Nacoleia albicilialis is a moth in the family Crambidae. It was described by George Hampson in 1903. It is found in Sri Lanka.
