= Symphonia nymphulalis =

Scientific classification
- Kingdom: Animalia
- Phylum: Arthropoda
- Class: Insecta
- Order: Lepidoptera
- Family: Crambidae
- Genus: Symphonia
- Species: S. nymphulalis

Binomial name
- Symphonia nymphulalis Marion & Viette, 1956

Species of moth

Symphonia nymphulalis is a species of moth in the family Crambidae. It was described by Hubert Marion and Pierre Viette in 1956 and is found on Madagascar.
