= Lamprosema latinigralis =

Scientific classification
- Kingdom: Animalia
- Phylum: Arthropoda
- Class: Insecta
- Order: Lepidoptera
- Family: Crambidae
- Genus: Lamprosema
- Species: L. latinigralis

Binomial name
- Lamprosema latinigralis (Hampson, 1899)

Synonyms
- Pyrausta latinigralis Hampson, 1899

Species of moth

Lamprosema latinigralis is a moth in the family Crambidae. It was described by George Hampson in 1899. It is found in the Democratic Republic of the Congo and Nigeria.
