= Symphonia marionalis =

Scientific classification
- Kingdom: Animalia
- Phylum: Arthropoda
- Class: Insecta
- Order: Lepidoptera
- Family: Crambidae
- Genus: Symphonia
- Species: S. marionalis

Binomial name
- Symphonia marionalis Viette, 1958

Species of moth

Symphonia marionalis is a species of moth in the family Crambidae. It was described by Viette in 1958. It is found in Madagascar.
