= Lamprosema sinaloanensis =

Scientific classification
- Kingdom: Animalia
- Phylum: Arthropoda
- Class: Insecta
- Order: Lepidoptera
- Family: Crambidae
- Genus: Lamprosema
- Species: L. sinaloanensis

Binomial name
- Lamprosema sinaloanensis Dyar, 1923

Species of moth

Lamprosema sinaloanensis is a moth in the family Crambidae. It was described by Harrison Gray Dyar Jr. in 1923. It is found in Mexico (Sinaloa) and the United States (southern California and southern Texas).
