= Lamprosema hebitare =

Scientific classification
- Domain: Eukaryota
- Kingdom: Animalia
- Phylum: Arthropoda
- Class: Insecta
- Order: Lepidoptera
- Family: Crambidae
- Genus: Lamprosema
- Species: L. hebitare

Binomial name
- Lamprosema hebitare Whalley, 1962

Species of moth

Lamprosema hebitare is a moth in the Crambidae family. It was described by Whalley in 1962. It is found on the Solomon Islands.
