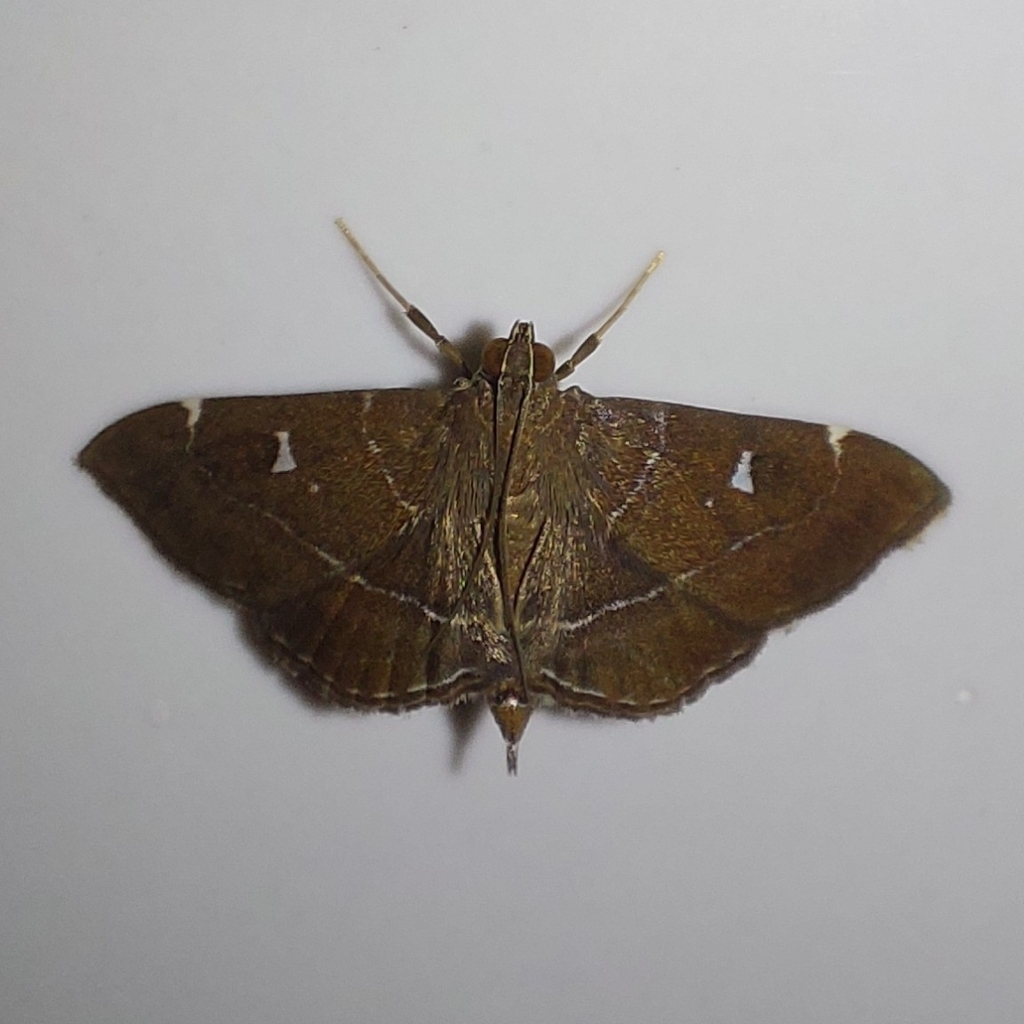

Scientific classification
- Kingdom: Animalia
- Phylum: Arthropoda
- Class: Insecta
- Order: Lepidoptera
- Family: Crambidae
- Genus: Lamprosema
- Species: L. dorisalis

Binomial name
- Lamprosema dorisalis (Walker, 1859)

Synonyms
- Botys dorisalis Walker, 1859; Nacoleia dorsalis; Botys aenippealis Walker, 1859; Nacoleia oenippealis Hampson, 1899; Botys codrusalis Walker, 1859

= Lamprosema dorisalis =

Species of moth

Lamprosema dorisalis is a moth in the family Crambidae. It was described by Francis Walker in 1859. It is found in Colombia and Brazil.
