= Lamprosema tienmushanus =

Scientific classification
- Kingdom: Animalia
- Phylum: Arthropoda
- Class: Insecta
- Order: Lepidoptera
- Family: Crambidae
- Genus: Lamprosema
- Species: L. tienmushanus

Binomial name
- Lamprosema tienmushanus Caradja & Meyrick, 1935

Species of moth

Lamprosema tienmushanus is a moth in the family Crambidae. It was described by Aristide Caradja and Edward Meyrick in 1935. It is found in China.
