= Nacoleia fumidalis =

Scientific classification
- Kingdom: Animalia
- Phylum: Arthropoda
- Clade: Pancrustacea
- Class: Insecta
- Order: Lepidoptera
- Family: Crambidae
- Genus: Nacoleia
- Species: N. fumidalis

Binomial name
- Nacoleia fumidalis (Leech, 1889)

Synonyms
- Samea fumidalis Leech, 1889

Species of moth

Nacoleia fumidalis is a moth in the family Crambidae. It was described by John Henry Leech in 1889. It is found in Japan.
