= Lamprosema rubricetalis =

Scientific classification
- Kingdom: Animalia
- Phylum: Arthropoda
- Class: Insecta
- Order: Lepidoptera
- Family: Crambidae
- Genus: Lamprosema
- Species: L. rubricetalis

Binomial name
- Lamprosema rubricetalis (Snellen, 1880)

Synonyms
- Botys rubricetalis Snellen, 1880

Species of moth

Lamprosema rubricetalis is a moth in the family Crambidae. It was described by Snellen in 1880. It is found on Sulawesi.
