= Lamprosema marionalis =

Scientific classification
- Kingdom: Animalia
- Phylum: Arthropoda
- Class: Insecta
- Order: Lepidoptera
- Family: Crambidae
- Genus: Lamprosema
- Species: L. marionalis

Binomial name
- Lamprosema marionalis (Walker, 1859)

Synonyms
- Desmia marionalis Walker, 1859

Species of moth

Lamprosema marionalis is a moth in the family Crambidae. It was described by Francis Walker in 1859. It is found on Borneo.
