= Lamprosema atsinana =

Scientific classification
- Kingdom: Animalia
- Phylum: Arthropoda
- Class: Insecta
- Order: Lepidoptera
- Family: Crambidae
- Genus: Lamprosema
- Species: L. atsinana

Binomial name
- Lamprosema atsinana Viette, 1989

Species of moth

Lamprosema atsinana is a moth in the family Crambidae. It was described by Viette in 1989. It is found in Madagascar.
