= Nacoleia glageropa =

Scientific classification
- Kingdom: Animalia
- Phylum: Arthropoda
- Clade: Pancrustacea
- Class: Insecta
- Order: Lepidoptera
- Family: Crambidae
- Genus: Nacoleia
- Species: N. glageropa

Binomial name
- Nacoleia glageropa Turner, 1908

Species of moth

Nacoleia glageropa is a moth in the family Crambidae. It was described by Turner in 1908. It is found in Australia, where it has been recorded from Queensland and New South Wales.

The wingspan is about 22 mm. The forewings are fuscous mixed with white, forming ill-defined blotches near the base on the subcostal area and at the tornus. The lines are fuscous. The hindwings are fuscous, but whitish towards the base. The fuscous lines are lost in the ground colour, but are edged posteriorly with white.
