= Lamprosema clausalis =

Scientific classification
- Domain: Eukaryota
- Kingdom: Animalia
- Phylum: Arthropoda
- Class: Insecta
- Order: Lepidoptera
- Family: Crambidae
- Genus: Lamprosema
- Species: L. clausalis

Binomial name
- Lamprosema clausalis (Dognin, 1910)

Synonyms
- Nacoleia clausalis Dognin, 1910

Species of moth

Lamprosema clausalis is a moth in the family Crambidae. It was described by Paul Dognin in 1910. It is found in French Guiana.
