= Nacoleia vittifera =

Scientific classification
- Kingdom: Animalia
- Phylum: Arthropoda
- Clade: Pancrustacea
- Class: Insecta
- Order: Lepidoptera
- Family: Crambidae
- Genus: Nacoleia
- Species: N. vittifera

Binomial name
- Nacoleia vittifera Hampson, 1899

Species of moth

Nacoleia vittifera is a moth in the family Crambidae. It was described by George Hampson in 1899. It is found in Indonesia (Ambon Island) and Papua New Guinea, where it has been recorded from the D'Entrecasteaux Islands (Fergusson Island).
