= Lamprosema canacealis =

Scientific classification
- Kingdom: Animalia
- Phylum: Arthropoda
- Class: Insecta
- Order: Lepidoptera
- Family: Crambidae
- Genus: Lamprosema
- Species: L. canacealis

Binomial name
- Lamprosema canacealis (Walker, 1859)

Synonyms
- Desmia canacealis Walker, 1859

Species of moth

Lamprosema canacealis is a moth in the family Crambidae. It was described by Francis Walker in 1859. It is found in Brazil.
