= Lamprosema insulicola =

Scientific classification
- Domain: Eukaryota
- Kingdom: Animalia
- Phylum: Arthropoda
- Class: Insecta
- Order: Lepidoptera
- Family: Crambidae
- Genus: Lamprosema
- Species: L. insulicola

Binomial name
- Lamprosema insulicola (T. B. Fletcher, 1922)

Synonyms
- Nacoleia insulicola T. B. Fletcher, 1922; Nacoleia maculalis T. B. Fletcher, 1910 (preocc.)

Species of moth

Lamprosema insulicola is a moth in the family Crambidae. It was described by Thomas Bainbrigge Fletcher in 1922. It is found on Praslin and Mahé in the Seychelles.
