= Lamprosema ochrimarginalis =

Scientific classification
- Domain: Eukaryota
- Kingdom: Animalia
- Phylum: Arthropoda
- Class: Insecta
- Order: Lepidoptera
- Family: Crambidae
- Genus: Lamprosema
- Species: L. ochrimarginalis

Binomial name
- Lamprosema ochrimarginalis (Marion, 1954)

Synonyms
- Nacoleia ochrimarginalis Marion, 1954

Species of moth

Lamprosema ochrimarginalis is a moth in the family Crambidae. It was described by Hubert Marion in 1954. It is found on Madagascar.
