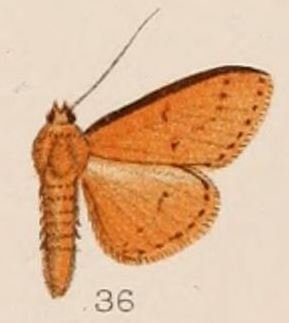

Scientific classification
- Kingdom: Animalia
- Phylum: Arthropoda
- Class: Insecta
- Order: Lepidoptera
- Family: Crambidae
- Genus: Lamprosema
- Species: L. nigricostalis

Binomial name
- Lamprosema nigricostalis (Hampson, 1908)

Synonyms
- Nacoleia nigricostalis Hampson, 1908

= Lamprosema nigricostalis =

Species of moth

Lamprosema nigricostalis is a species of moth of the family Crambidae described by George Hampson in 1908. It is found in India.
