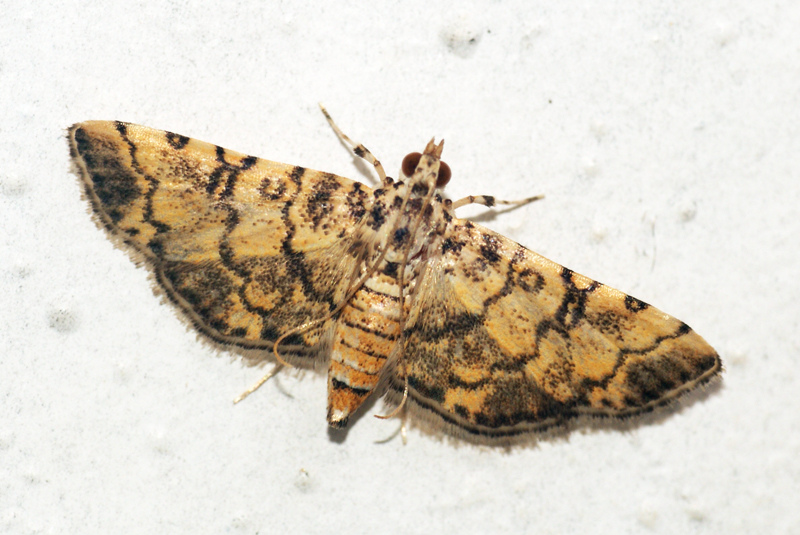

Scientific classification
- Kingdom: Animalia
- Phylum: Arthropoda
- Class: Insecta
- Order: Lepidoptera
- Family: Crambidae
- Genus: Lamprosema
- Species: L. tampiusalis

Binomial name
- Lamprosema tampiusalis (Walker, 1859)

Synonyms
- Botys tampiusalis Walker, 1859; Nacoleia tampiusalis; Botys ilusalis Walker, 1859

= Lamprosema tampiusalis =

Species of moth

Lamprosema tampiusalis is a moth in the family Crambidae. It was described by Francis Walker in 1859. It is found on Borneo and in Thailand, Nepal, China, Myanmar, Korea and Japan.
