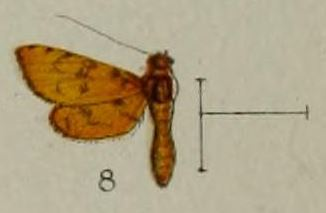

Scientific classification
- Kingdom: Animalia
- Phylum: Arthropoda
- Class: Insecta
- Order: Lepidoptera
- Family: Crambidae
- Genus: Preneopogon
- Species: P. progonialis

Binomial name
- Preneopogon progonialis (Hampson, 1898)

Synonyms
- Nacoleia progonialis Hampson, 1898; Lamprosema progonialis Hampson, 1898

= Preneopogon progonialis =

Species of moth

Preneopogon progonialis is a moth in the family Crambidae. It was described by George Hampson in 1898. It is found on New Guinea.
