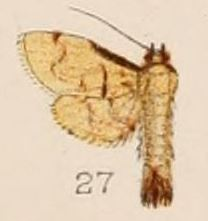

Scientific classification
- Kingdom: Animalia
- Phylum: Arthropoda
- Class: Insecta
- Order: Lepidoptera
- Family: Crambidae
- Genus: Lamprosema
- Species: L. tumidicostalis

Binomial name
- Lamprosema tumidicostalis (Hampson, 1908)

Synonyms
- Nacoleia tumidicostalis Hampson, 1908

= Lamprosema tumidicostalis =

Species of moth

Lamprosema tumidicostalis is a species of moth of the family Crambidae. It can be found in India (Madras) .

Its wingspan is 20 mm.
