= Lamprosema biformis =

Scientific classification
- Kingdom: Animalia
- Phylum: Arthropoda
- Class: Insecta
- Order: Lepidoptera
- Family: Crambidae
- Genus: Lamprosema
- Species: L. biformis

Binomial name
- Lamprosema biformis (Butler, 1889)

Synonyms
- Danaga biformis Butler, 1889; Symphonia secunda Strand, 1919

Species of moth

Lamprosema biformis is a species of moth in the family Crambidae. It was described by Arthur Gardiner Butler in 1889. It is found in Taiwan.
