= Nacoleia immundalis =

Scientific classification
- Kingdom: Animalia
- Phylum: Arthropoda
- Clade: Pancrustacea
- Class: Insecta
- Order: Lepidoptera
- Family: Crambidae
- Genus: Nacoleia
- Species: N. immundalis

Binomial name
- Nacoleia immundalis South in Leech & South, 1901

Synonyms
- Lamprosema immundalis

Species of moth

Nacoleia immundalis is a moth in the family Crambidae. It was described by South in 1901. It is found in China (Hubei).
