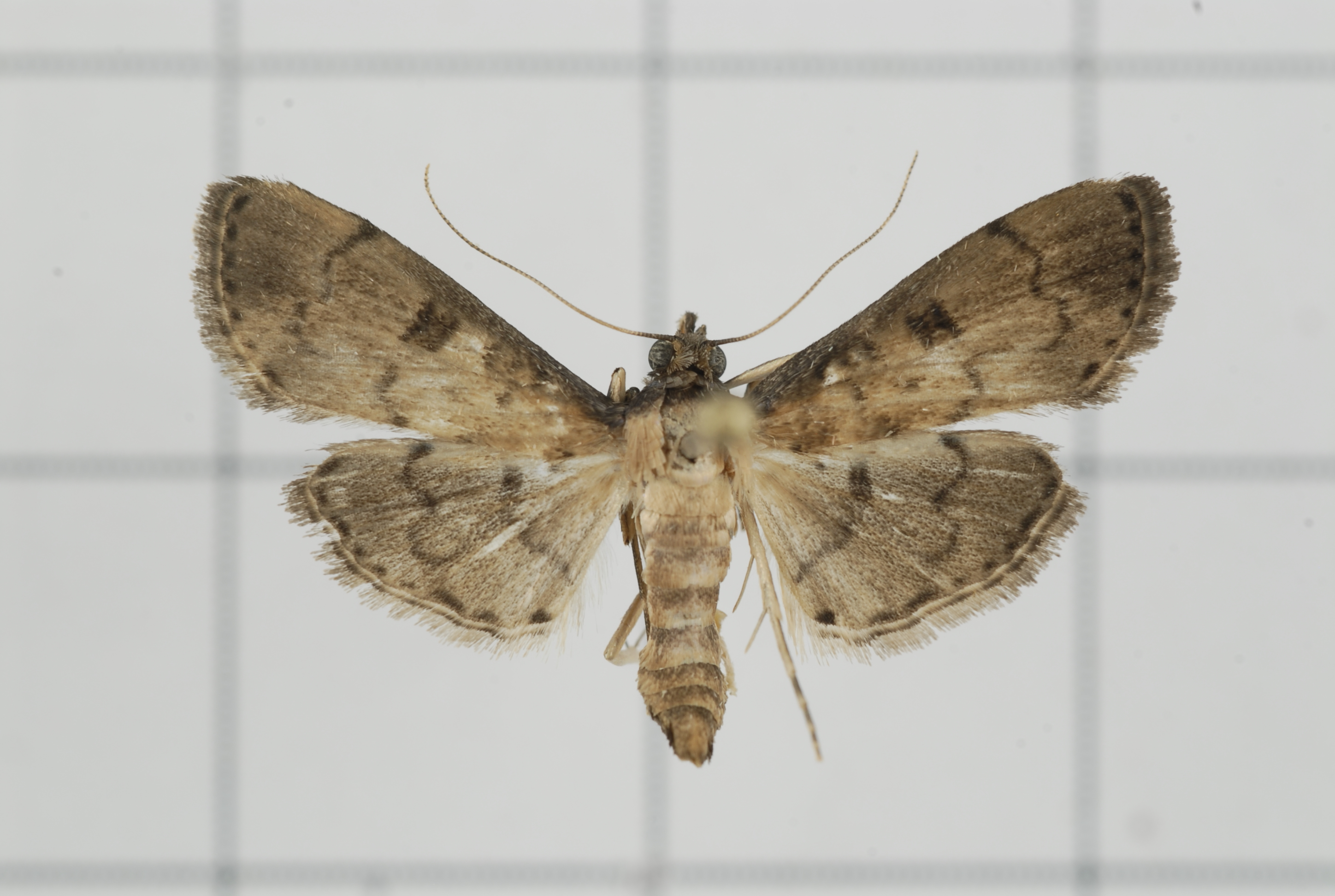

Scientific classification
- Kingdom: Animalia
- Phylum: Arthropoda
- Clade: Pancrustacea
- Class: Insecta
- Order: Lepidoptera
- Family: Crambidae
- Genus: Nacoleia
- Species: N. charesalis

Binomial name
- Nacoleia charesalis (Walker, 1859)

Synonyms
- Botys charesalis Walker, 1859; Sylepta argillitis Turner, 1937; Psara delhommealis Legrand, 1966; Botys molusalis Walker, 1859; Lampridia vetustalis Strand, 1918

= Nacoleia charesalis =

Species of moth

Nacoleia charesalis is a moth in the family Crambidae. It was described by Francis Walker in 1859. It is found in Australia, India, Sri Lanka, Borneo, Sumbawa, the Philippines, Singapore, Thailand, Japan, Taiwan and on the Seychelles (Mahé, Félicité, Praslin)

The larvae have been recorded feeding on Rubroshorea leprosula, Shorea macroptera and Shorea parvifolia.
