= Lamprosema distinctifascia =

Scientific classification
- Domain: Eukaryota
- Kingdom: Animalia
- Phylum: Arthropoda
- Class: Insecta
- Order: Lepidoptera
- Family: Crambidae
- Genus: Lamprosema
- Species: L. distinctifascia

Binomial name
- Lamprosema distinctifascia (Rothschild, 1916)

Synonyms
- Nacoleia distinctifascia Rothschild, 1916

Species of moth

Lamprosema distinctifascia is a moth in the family Crambidae. It was described by Rothschild in 1916. It is found in Papua New Guinea.
