= Lamprosema nomangara =

Scientific classification
- Kingdom: Animalia
- Phylum: Arthropoda
- Class: Insecta
- Order: Lepidoptera
- Family: Crambidae
- Genus: Lamprosema
- Species: L. nomangara

Binomial name
- Lamprosema nomangara (Viette, 1981)

Synonyms
- Nacoleia nomangara Viette, 1981

Species of moth

Lamprosema nomangara is a moth in the family Crambidae. It was described by Viette in 1981. It is found in Madagascar.
