= Lamprosema kingdoni =

Scientific classification
- Domain: Eukaryota
- Kingdom: Animalia
- Phylum: Arthropoda
- Class: Insecta
- Order: Lepidoptera
- Family: Crambidae
- Genus: Lamprosema
- Species: L. kingdoni

Binomial name
- Lamprosema kingdoni (Butler, 1879)

Synonyms
- Botys kingdoni Butler, 1879

Species of moth

Lamprosema kingdoni is a moth in the family Crambidae. It was described by Arthur Gardiner Butler in 1879. It is found in Madagascar.
