= Lamprosema salomonalis =

Scientific classification
- Domain: Eukaryota
- Kingdom: Animalia
- Phylum: Arthropoda
- Class: Insecta
- Order: Lepidoptera
- Family: Crambidae
- Genus: Lamprosema
- Species: L. salomonalis

Binomial name
- Lamprosema salomonalis (T. B. Fletcher, 1910)

Synonyms
- Nacoleia salomonalis T. B. Fletcher, 1910

Species of moth

Lamprosema salomonalis is a moth in the family Crambidae. It was described by Thomas Bainbrigge Fletcher in 1910. It is found on the Chagos Archipelago in the Indian Ocean.
