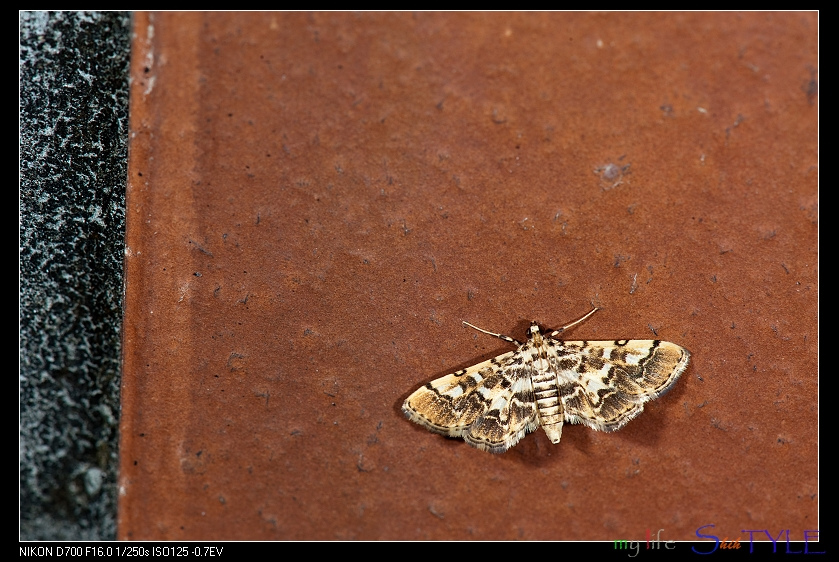

Scientific classification
- Kingdom: Animalia
- Phylum: Arthropoda
- Clade: Pancrustacea
- Class: Insecta
- Order: Lepidoptera
- Family: Crambidae
- Genus: Lamprosema
- Species: L. commixta

Binomial name
- Lamprosema commixta (Butler, 1873)

Synonyms
- Samea commixta Butler, 1873; Nacoleia costisignalis Moore, 1885

= Lamprosema commixta =

Species of moth

Lamprosema commixta is a moth in the family Crambidae. It was described by Arthur Gardiner Butler in 1873. It is found in Japan, Korea, Taiwan, China, Cambodia, Vietnam, Nepal, India and Sri Lanka.

The wingspan is about 17 mm.
