= Lamprosema sibirialis =

Scientific classification
- Domain: Eukaryota
- Kingdom: Animalia
- Phylum: Arthropoda
- Class: Insecta
- Order: Lepidoptera
- Family: Crambidae
- Genus: Lamprosema
- Species: L. sibirialis

Binomial name
- Lamprosema sibirialis (Millière, 1879)

Synonyms
- Stenia sibirialis Millière, 1879; Agrotera fenestralis Christoph, 1881; Nacoleia maculalis South, 1901

Species of moth

Lamprosema sibirialis is a moth in the family Crambidae. It was described by Pierre Millière in 1879. It is found in Russia (Siberia, Amur), Korea, China and Japan.

The wingspan is 15–18 mm. Adults are on wing from May to October.
