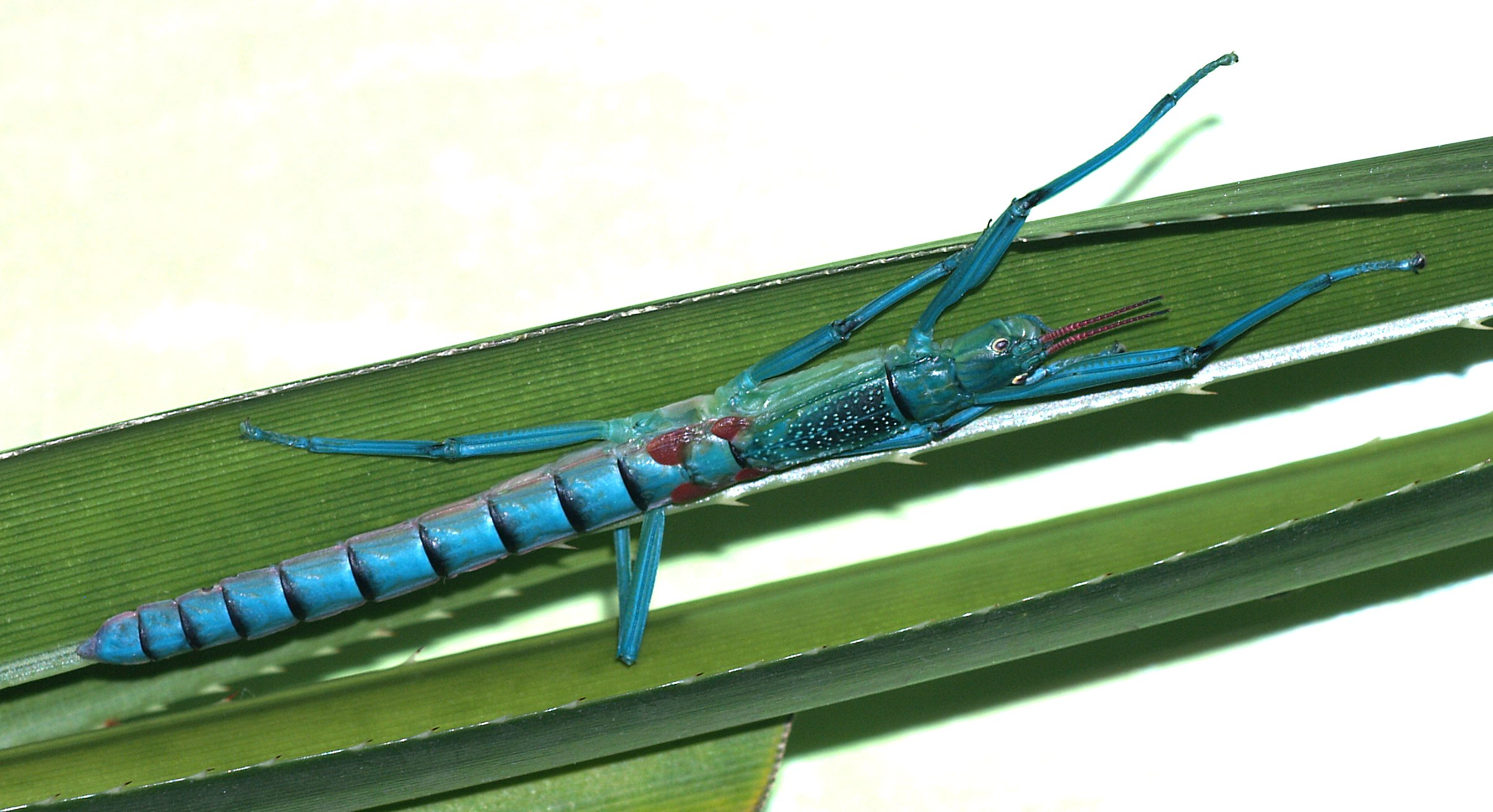

Conservation status
- Vulnerable (EPBC Act)

Scientific classification
- Kingdom: Animalia
- Phylum: Arthropoda
- Class: Insecta
- Order: Phasmatodea
- Family: Phasmatidae
- Genus: Megacrania
- Species: M. batesii

Binomial name
- Megacrania batesii Kirby, 1896

Synonyms
- Megacrania batesi Redtenbacher, 1908

= Megacrania batesii =

Species of insect

Megacrania batesii, commonly known as the peppermint stick insect, is an unusual species of stick insect found in northeastern Australia, the Bismarck Archipelago, the Solomon Islands, New Guinea, and possibly as far north as the Philippines. It is notable for its aposematic coloration, as well as its robust chemical defense mechanism. Its common name refers to the irritating fluid — with an odor resembling peppermint — that it sprays as a defensive action from a pair of glands located at its prothorax when threatened, as well as the cylindrical, twig-like shape of its body. A member of the subfamily Megacraniinae, it was first described by English naturalist and explorer Henry Walter Bates in 1865.

Within their distribution, the habitat of these large insects occurs in complex mesophyll vine forests (lowland tropical and subtropical rainforests), at the transition area between the forest and the beach. They can be found in small numbers in such places, resting on the upper surfaces of the leaves of various species in the Pandanaceae family. Some of the isolated subpopulations of this species in northern Queensland are at risk for local extinction as a result of natural or anthropogenic hazards.

This species appears to reproduce primarily by parthenogenesis, although sexual reproduction has also been observed. Predators of this insect include spiders, centipedes, green tree ants, mantises, katydids, and some birds. At least one species of parasitoid wasp has been observed to lay their eggs in the eggs of M. batesii.

== Taxonomy ==
This species was first described (as Platycrania alpheus) by Henry Walter Bates in 1865, and reclassified in 1896 by William Forsell Kirby. It is one of twelve known species within genus Megacrania.

== Description ==
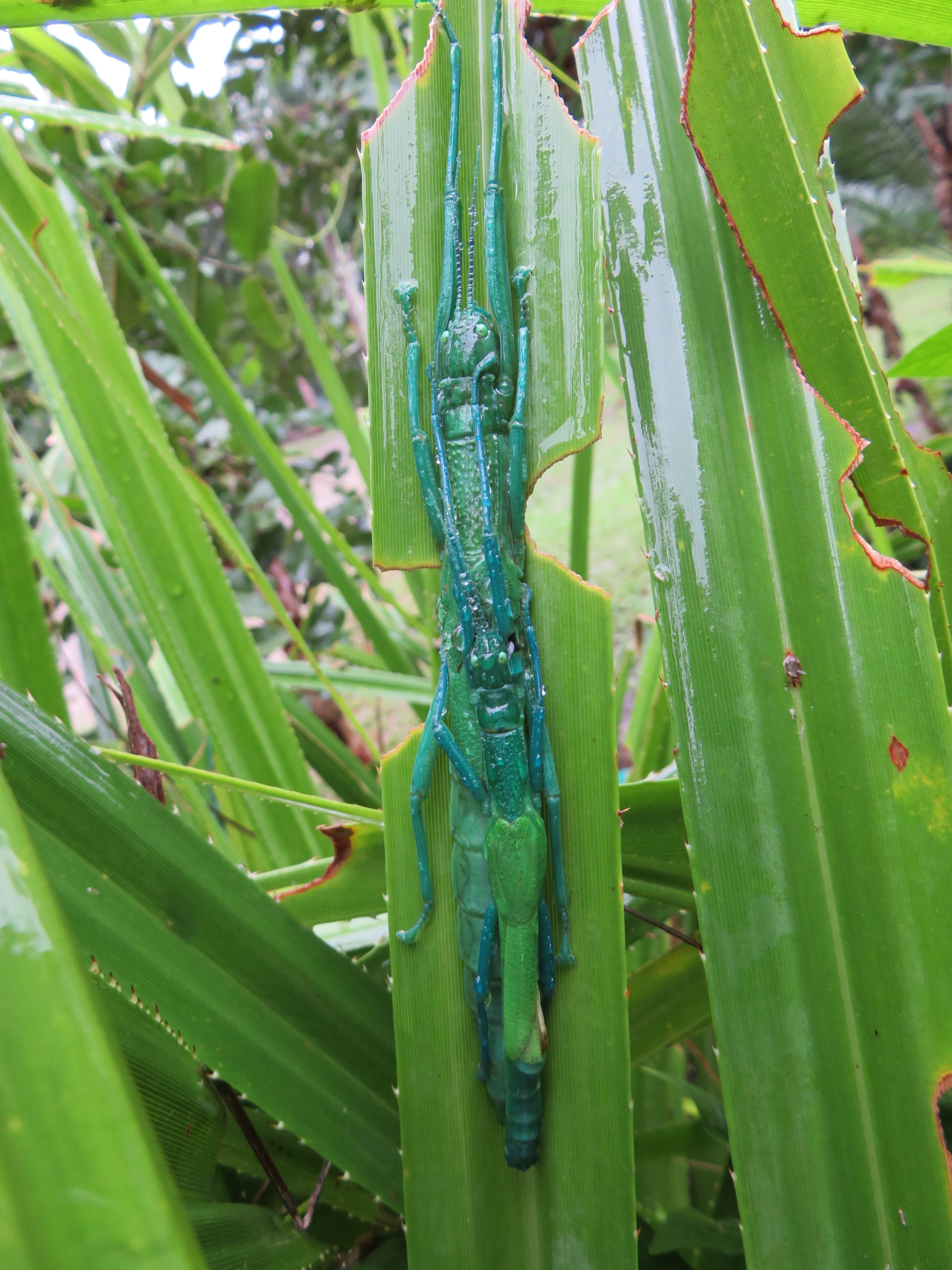
Adults mating at Cape Tribulation, Queensland, Australia

As is the case with most species of Phasmatodea, the males are significantly smaller than their female counterparts. The body length is 76–87 millimeters (3.0–3.4 in) in males, versus 98–137 millimeters (3.9–5.4 in) in females. The prothorax and mesothorax are also smaller in males. The tegmina are roughly the same size in both sexes, but the hind wings are larger in males, relative to their body size.

In the case of adults and the last larval instars, the entire body is a mostly uniform pale green; the head, thorax, mesothorax and legs are somewhat darker in color than the tegmina. In some cases, the antennae and wing-buds and eyes may be a different color (yellow, red, or black).

== Distribution and habitat ==
M. batesii occurs in a restricted and patchy distribution in the Solomon Islands and New Guinea, and possibly the Philippines. There are also two distinct populations of these insects in Australia: one on the Cape York Peninsula in Queensland, and the other on the Sir Edward Pellew Group of Islands in the Gulf of Carpentaria. The habitat is complex mesophyll vine forests, typically at the transition area between the rainforest and the beach, where the insects live in pandanus plants. In rare cases, this species has been recorded beside rainforest streams or swamps as far as 5 km inland. Because the distribution of this species occurs over a very small (less than 100 km^{2}) and highly fragmented area, it appears to meet the IUCN criteria for a vulnerable species. Some of the isolated subpopulations of this species in northern Queensland are at risk for local extinction as a result of natural or anthropogenic hazards.

== Behavior and ecology ==
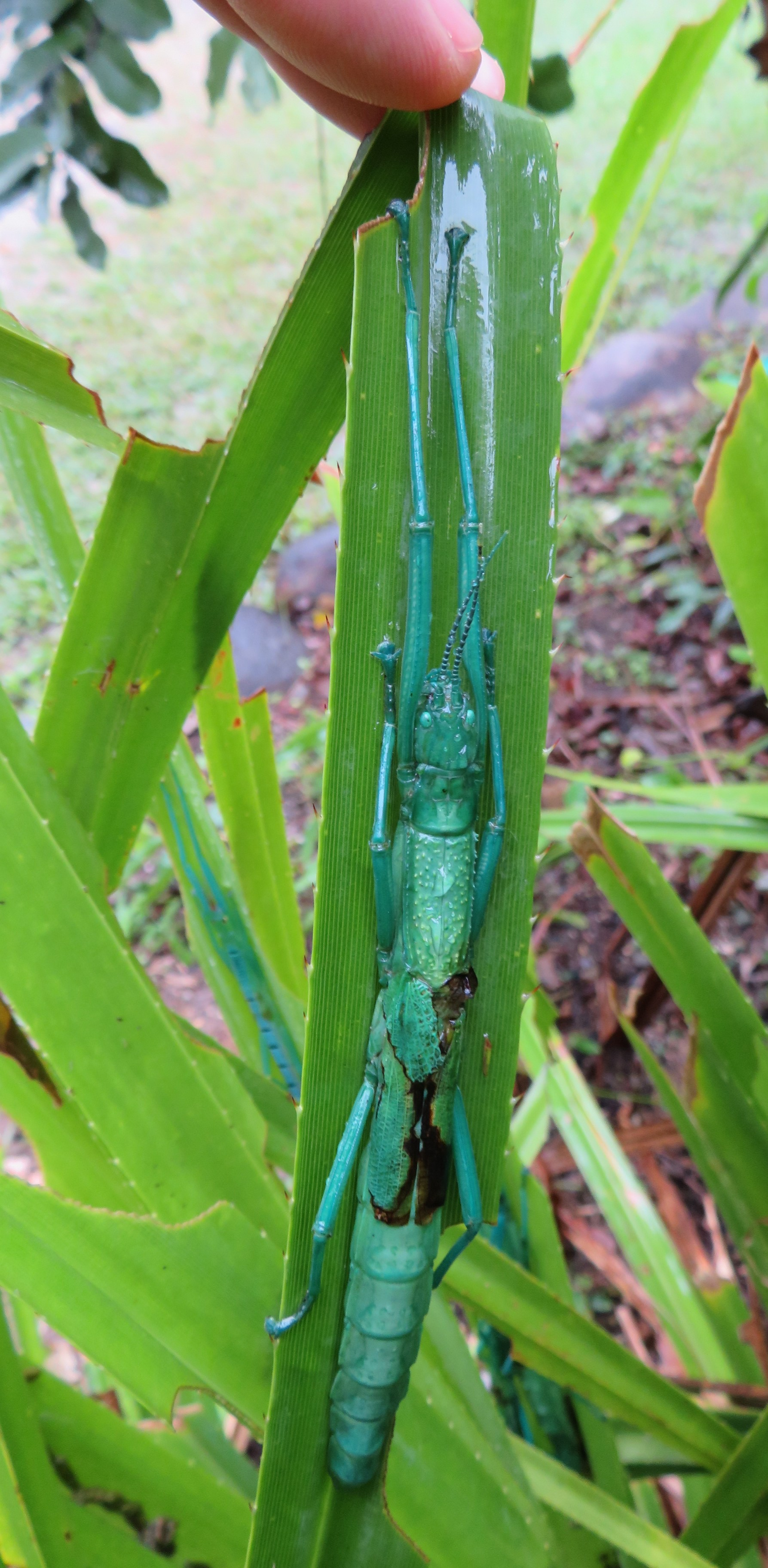
Adult female at Cape Tribulation, Queensland, Australia. In this image, the left prothoracic gland can be seen at the dorsolateral aspect of the anterior margin of the prothorax.

These sedentary insects are typically found resting on the upper surfaces of the leaves of various species in the Pandanaceae family upon which they feed, with the front and mid legs stretched far forward and the hind legs stretched to the rear. They do not appear to use their hind legs for locomotion.

Although both sexes have wings, M. batesii cannot fly. The males, whose hind wings are larger in proportion to their body size, are capable of "parachuting" to the forest floor when threatened. They are not gregarious insects, with rarely more than 3 individuals residing on any given leaf cluster.

=== Diet and predators ===
M. batesii has been observed to feed on three species of Pandanaceae in the wild: Benstonea monticola, Pandanus solms-laubachii, and P. tectorius. The presence of these phasmids can be inferred by detecting the feeding scars they leave on the plants, which are readily distinguishable from those of the few other insects that feed on them. In captivity, they have been observed to feed on unspecified species of Freycinetia, as well as P. gemmifer, P. utilis, and P. whitei.

Although these insects can inflict a great deal of damage to the plants upon which they feed, they are not typically considered to be pests because the host plant is not of significant economic importance. That said, at least one example has been reported in which an infestation of stick insects — possibly M. batesii — in Capiz Province on Panay Island in the Philippines has resulted in the destruction of pandanus plants used in the manufacture of mats.

Predators of this insect include huntsman spiders, jumping spiders, scolopendrid centipedes, green tree ants, mantises, katydids, and black butcherbirds. Throughout their distribution within Queensland, eggs of M. batesii have been observed to be parasitized by eupelmid wasps of genus Anastatus.

=== Life cycle and reproduction ===
The vast majority of specimens observed and collected in the wild are female, with male specimens being uncommon. Parthenogenesis appears to be the primary means of reproduction in some populations of M. batesii, although sexual reproduction has been observed in other populations, including in captivity.

=== Defense mechanisms ===
There are roughly 2500 known species of stick insects. These large and often apterous insects are vulnerable to predators because they are slow and clumsy. Most species employ crypsis (for example, they are usually colored and shaped like twigs and leaves) as a primary defense mechanism. Only a few known species are aposematically colored or protected by defensive scent glands.

In addition to its aposematic coloration, M. batesii possesses a robust chemical defense mechanism. When sufficiently provoked (especially when the thorax and abdomen are touched) or when cornered by a perceived predator, these insects can spray an aerosolized cloud of noxious sticky white fluid from a pair of glands located at the prothorax.

In an early description of a closely related species (Megacrania wegneri) in the Maluku Islands of Indonesia, Wegner reported that even immature phasmids were already in possession of a well-developed chemical defense mechanism. He noted that the noxious effluvium could be directed in front of the insect as well as to the rear. He further noted that the female was able to eject the substance as far as 75 centimeters (30 in), and even the considerably smaller male can spray up to 50 centimeters (20 in). Wegner also carefully described the paired prothoracic glands — these are pits located on the left and right side, dorsolaterally, at the anterior margin of the prothorax. When threatened, the phasmid contracts a muscle that extrudes a dome-shaped membrane through these pits. This membrane serves as a nozzle through which two jets of aerosolized fluid can be sprayed in either a forward or backward direction, depending on from where the insect perceives the threat.

A few other phasmid species possess a chemical defense mechanism involving the secretion of a noxious fluid from a pair of prothoracic glands when disturbed. In nearly every species of phasmid studied thus far, the active components of these secretions appear to be cyclopentanoid monoterpenes. The only known exceptions to this rule are Oreophoetes peruana and Cryptophyllium westwoodii. Quinoline is the active component in the former, while the secretions of the latter contain various alkylpyrazines.

Examples of phasmids which secrete cyclopentanoid monoterpenes from their prothoracic glands include several species of genus Anisomorpha, which secrete anisomorphal. Other examples include Megacrania alpheus, Megacrania nigrosulfurea, and Megacrania tsudai, three species closely related to M. batesii that possess a nearly identical chemical defense mechanism. Actinidine is the chief component of the substance secreted by the prothoracic glands of these three species.
