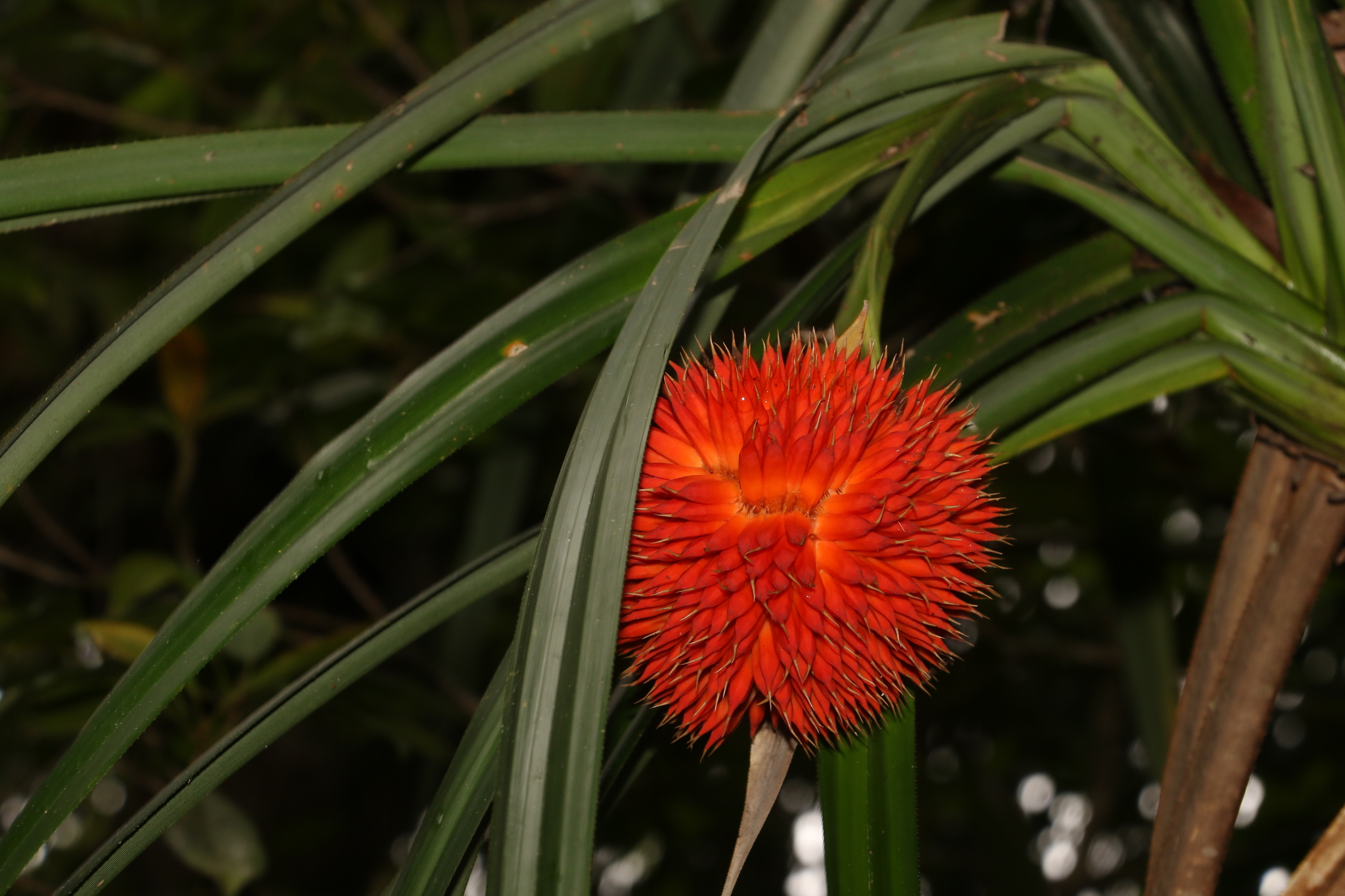
- Foliage and ripe fruit

Conservation status
- Least Concern (NCA)
- Least Concern (IUCN 3.1)

Scientific classification
- Kingdom: Plantae
- Clade: Tracheophytes
- Clade: Angiosperms
- Clade: Monocots
- Order: Pandanales
- Family: Pandanaceae
- Genus: Benstonea
- Species: B. monticola

Binomial name
- Benstonea monticola (F.Muell.) Callm. & Buerki
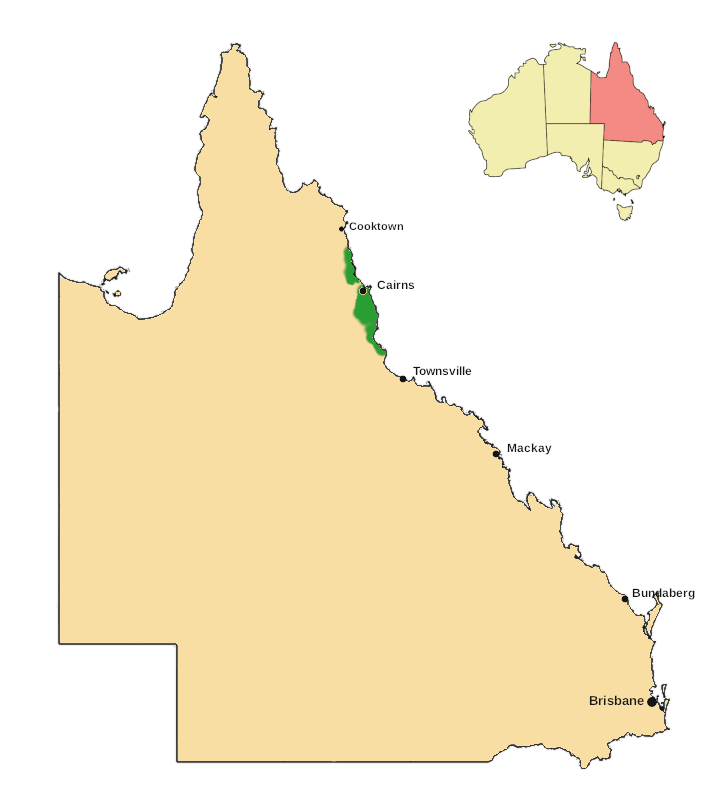

Synonyms
- Pandanus monticola F.Muell.; Pandanus pluvisilvaticus H.St.John

= Benstonea monticola =

Scrub breadfruit

Species of flowering plant

Benstonea monticola, commonly known as scrub breadfruit or urchin-fruited pandan, is a plant in the family Pandanaceae which is endemic to rainforested parts of north east Queensland, Australia.

== Description ==
The scrub breadfruit is an evergreen shrub or small tree usually growing to between 3 and 6 m (9.8 and 19.7 ft) high, and rarely to 10 m (33 ft). It produces multiple stems which are weak and become decumbent with age, i.e. they lean to one side and eventually lie on the ground with just the growing tip erect. The stems measure around 5 cm (2.0 in) in diameter, and prop roots (found in many species of Pandanaceae) are absent.

The leaves are tightly clustered on the growing tip of the stem and are arranged spirally. They are very long and narrow, measuring up to 2.5 m (8 ft 2 in) long by 5 cm (2.0 in) wide, and are ascendant to arching. They are dark green above and a lighter green below, and are pleated such that they have an M-shaped cross-section. Small spines are present on the leaf margins (edges) and the underside of the midrib.

This species is dioecious, meaning that functionally female and functionally male flowers are borne on separate plants. The inflorescence is a terminal spike, enclosed by large creamy-white bracts.

The fruit is a multiple fruit, in other words it is a single body consisting of the merged maturing ovaries of a cluster of flowers (cf. aggregate fruit). It is orange-red to bright red, roughly spherical to slightly egg-shaped, and measures up to 12 by 12 cm (4.7 by 4.7 in) Each fruit contains over 300 segments around 3 cm (1.2 in) long by 0.4 cm (0.16 in) wide, each tipped by a persistent style.

== Taxonomy ==
Benstonea monticola was first described as Pandanus monticola by the German-born botanist Ferdinand von Mueller, and published three times in his massive work Fragmenta phytographiæ Australiæ. In 2012 the new genus Benstonia was erected by Martin Callmander and Sven Buerki and 50 species (including this one) were transferred to it from Pandanus.

=== Etymology ===
The species epithet monticola is derived from the Latin words mons (mountain) and -cola (inhabitor), meaning "mountain dweller".

The common name "scrub breadfruit" is a reference to the superficial similarity of the fruit to the more well-known breadfruit.

== Distribution and habitat ==
The scrub breadfruit naturally occurs from the area of Cedar Bay (now part of Ngalba Bulal National Park), southward along the coast as far as Hinchinbrook Island, and inland to the Atherton Tablelands. It favours rainforest habitats and is found from sea level to around 800 m (2,600 ft).

== Ecology ==
Benstonea monticola, along with Pandanus tectorius and Pandanus solms-laubachii, is a host plant for the peppermint stick insect (Megacrania batesii), which shelters in the central hollow of the leaves and feeds on them. The fruits are eaten by cassowaries (Casuarius casuarius) and giant white-tailed rats (Uromys caudimaculatus).

== Conservation ==
This species is listed by the Queensland Department of Environment and Science as least concern. As of April 2023, it has not been assessed by the International Union for Conservation of Nature (IUCN).

== Gallery ==
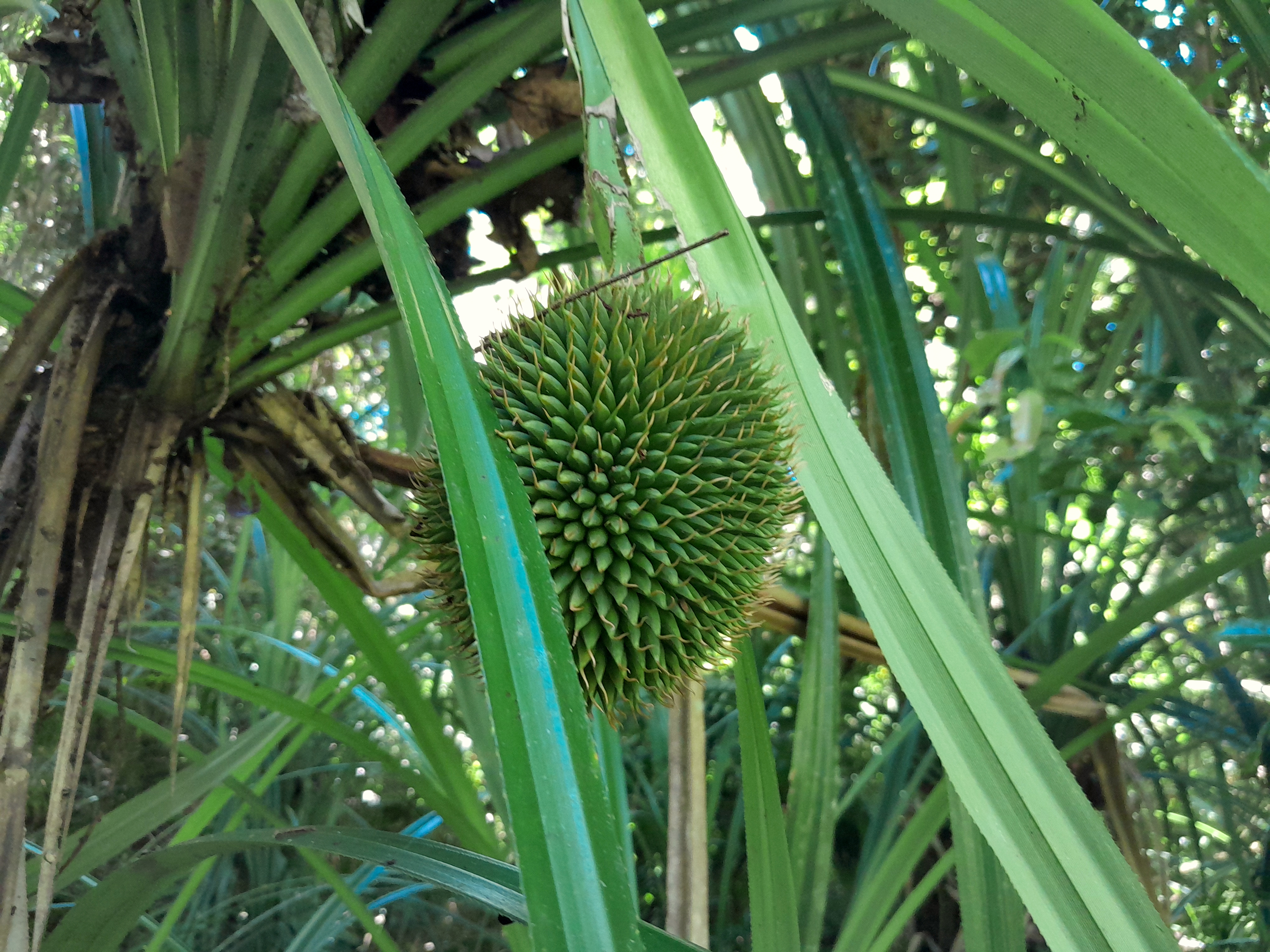
Plant with unripe fruit

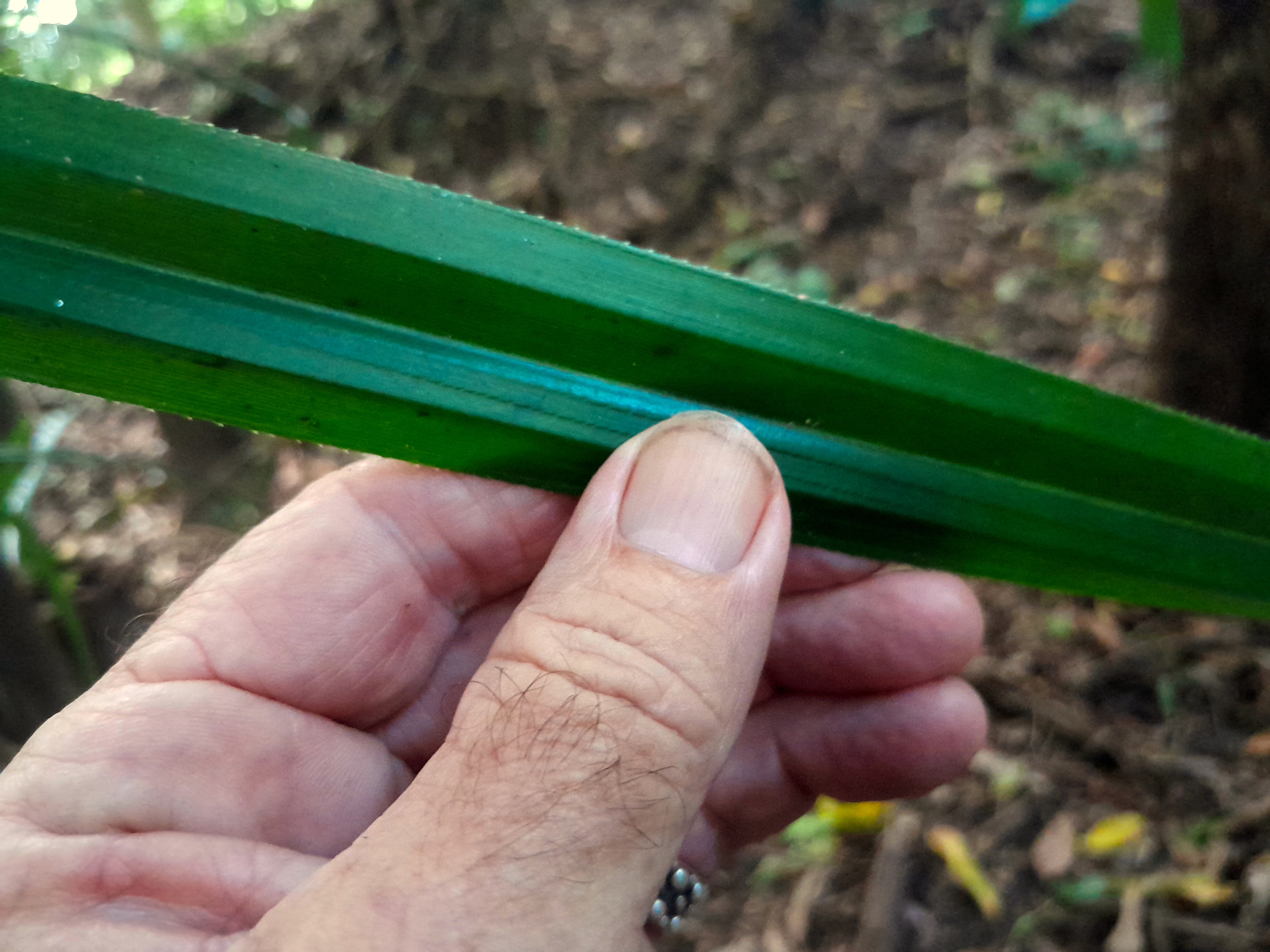
Leaf, showing marginal spines

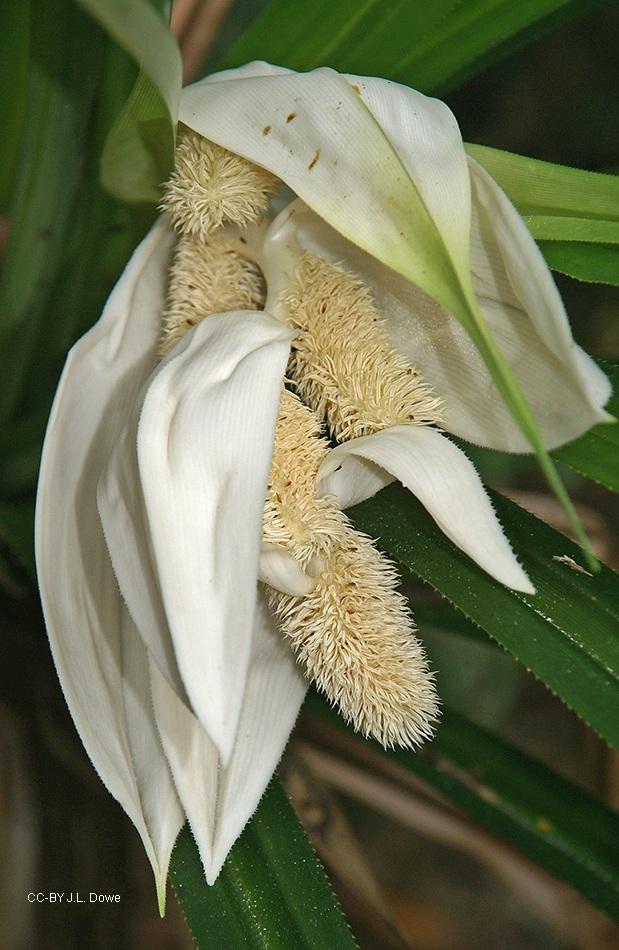
Inflorescence

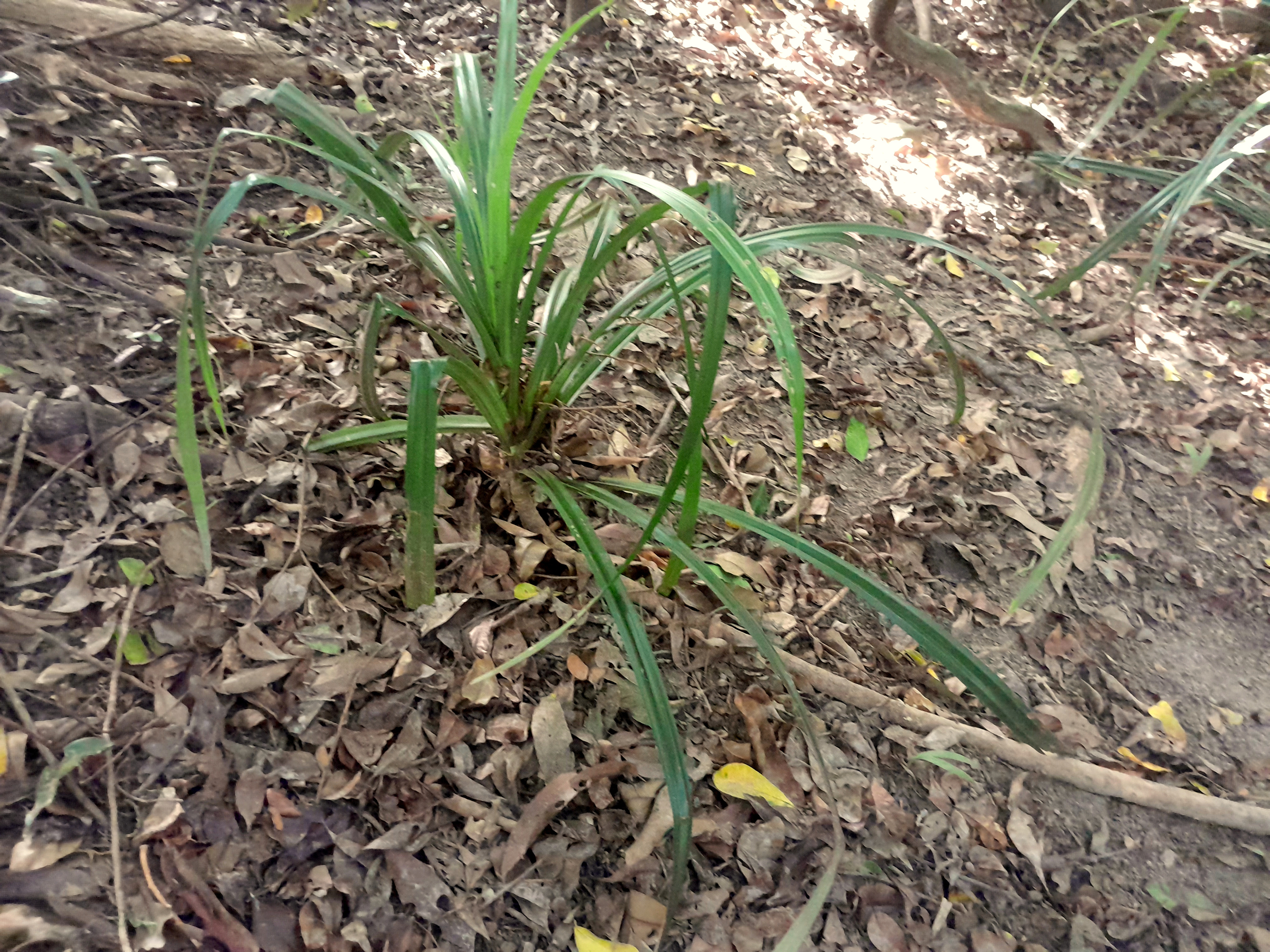
Decumbent stem with ascending tip
