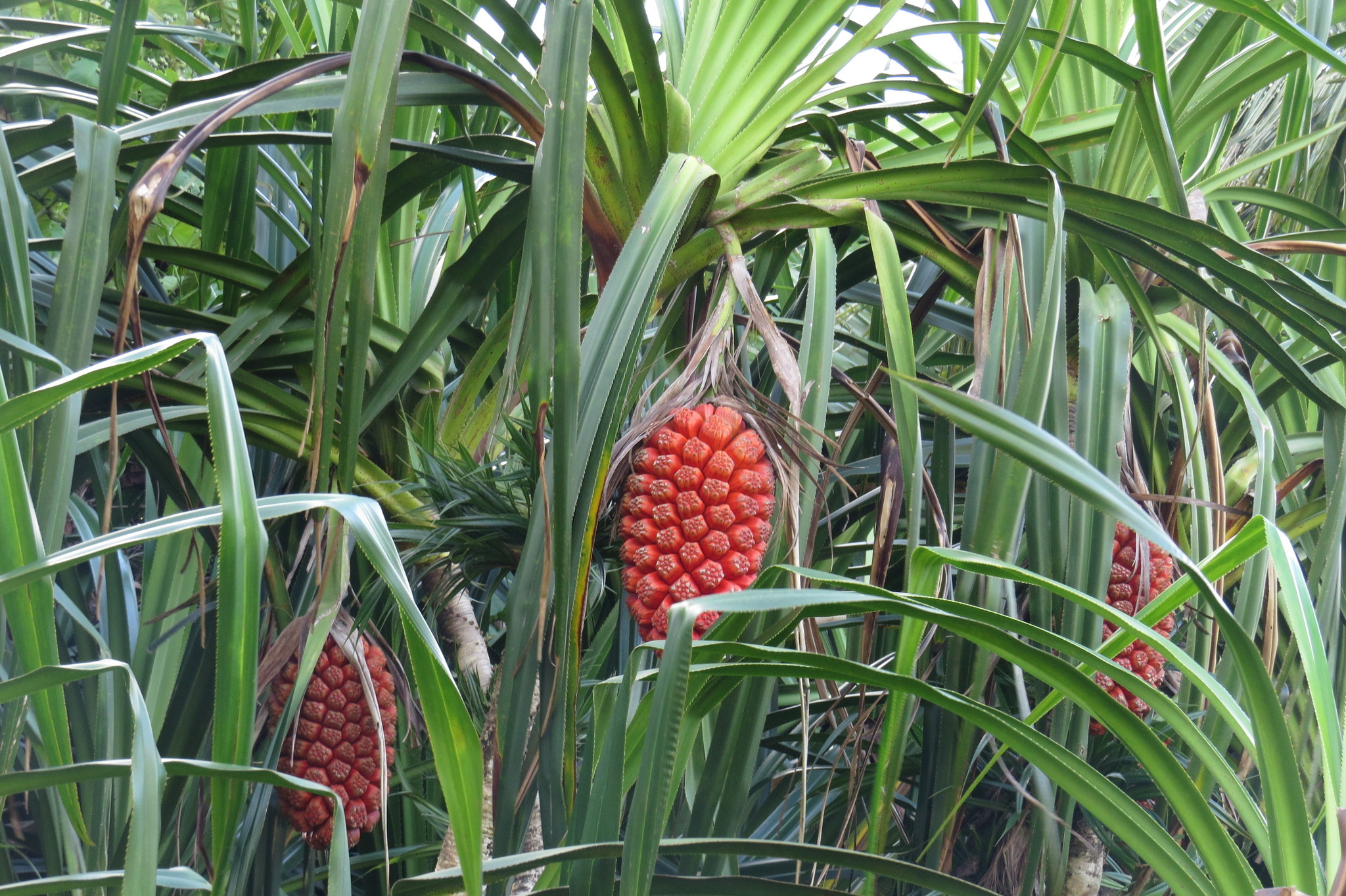

Conservation status
- Least Concern (NCA)

Scientific classification
- Kingdom: Plantae
- Clade: Tracheophytes
- Clade: Angiosperms
- Clade: Monocots
- Order: Pandanales
- Family: Pandanaceae
- Genus: Pandanus
- Species: P. grayorum

Binomial name
- Pandanus grayorum Calim., Buerki, Gallaher

= Pandanus grayorum =

Species of flowering plant

Pandanus grayorum is a plant in the family Pandanaceae which is endemic to a very small area of northeast Queensland. It is closely related to both Pandanus gemmifer and Pandanus solms-laubachii, and it coexists with the latter.

== Description ==
Pandanus grayorum is an evergreen tree growing up to 9 m (30 ft) high. Like P. gemmifer the stem is marked with spirally arranged nodules, and there are numerous "pups" or plantlets on the branches. There may be prop or stilt roots up to 50 cm (20 in) high emanating from the lowest portion of the stem. Leaves are about 250 cm (98 in) long, 9 cm (3.5 in) wide at the base and tapering gradually along the full length to a fine point. Small spurs occur along the leaf margins and midrib.

The inflorescence is terminal and pendant, occurring from mid-spring to mid-summer. The fruit is a syncarp measuring up to 40 cm (16 in) long by 22 cm (8.7 in) wide, orange-red in colour, with numerous segments each with 12–18 carpels. Fruit mature over a period of almost 12 months, ripening around the same time as the next season's flowers appear. The tree can also reproduce by means of the "pups", which detach and fall to the ground and can grow into a new plant beneath the parent.

== Taxonomy ==
This species was first described in 2020 by Martin Wilhelm Callmander, Sven Buerki, Frank Zich, Ashley R. Field and Timothy Gallaher. Their paper, titled "Pandanus grayorum (Pandanaceae), a new species endemic to north-eastern Queensland (Australia)", was published in June 2021 in the journal Australian Systematic Botany.

=== Etymology ===
The species epithet grayorum was chosen by the authors to honour the Australian botanist Bruce Gray, who spent many years working in North Queensland, on his 80th birthday.

== Distribution and habitat ==
Pandanus grayorum has a very limited distribution, occurring in lowland rainforest and mangrove forest margins in close proximity to the Russell, Mulgrave, Johnstone, Alice, and Moresby rivers in the coastal area between Cairns and Silkwood. It has an extent of occurrence (EEO) of 231 km^{2} (89 sq mi), with a very small area of occupancy (AOO) of just 28 km^{2} (11 sq mi).

== Conservation ==
This species is listed by the Queensland Department of Environment and Science as least concern. As of 15 February 2023, it has not been assessed by the IUCN.

The authors suggest in their paper that the species be given a status of vulnerable, due to the fact that most collections of it are from outside protected areas, and the areas adjacent to occurrences are mostly agricultural which are potentially subject to clearing.

== Gallery ==
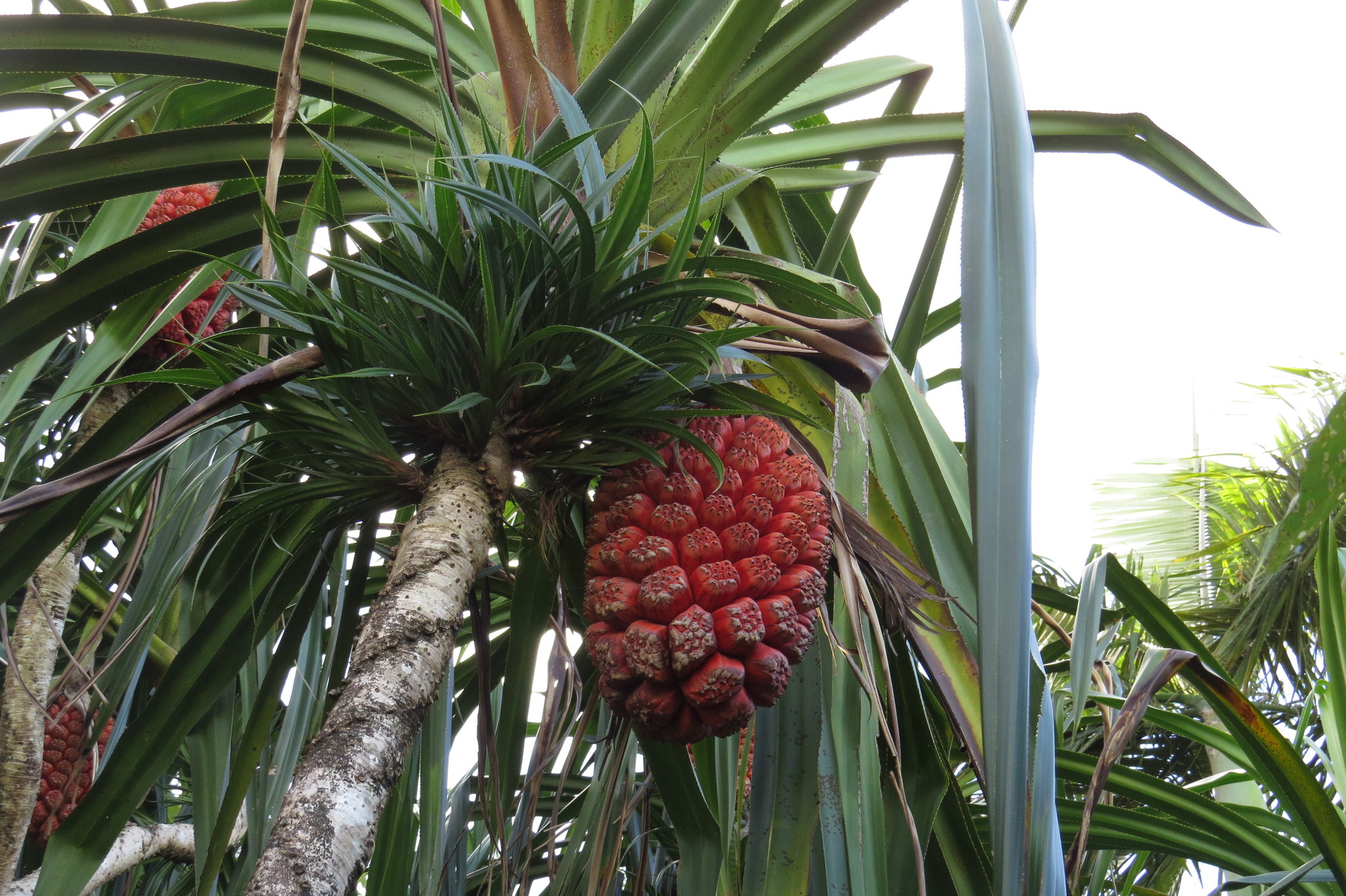

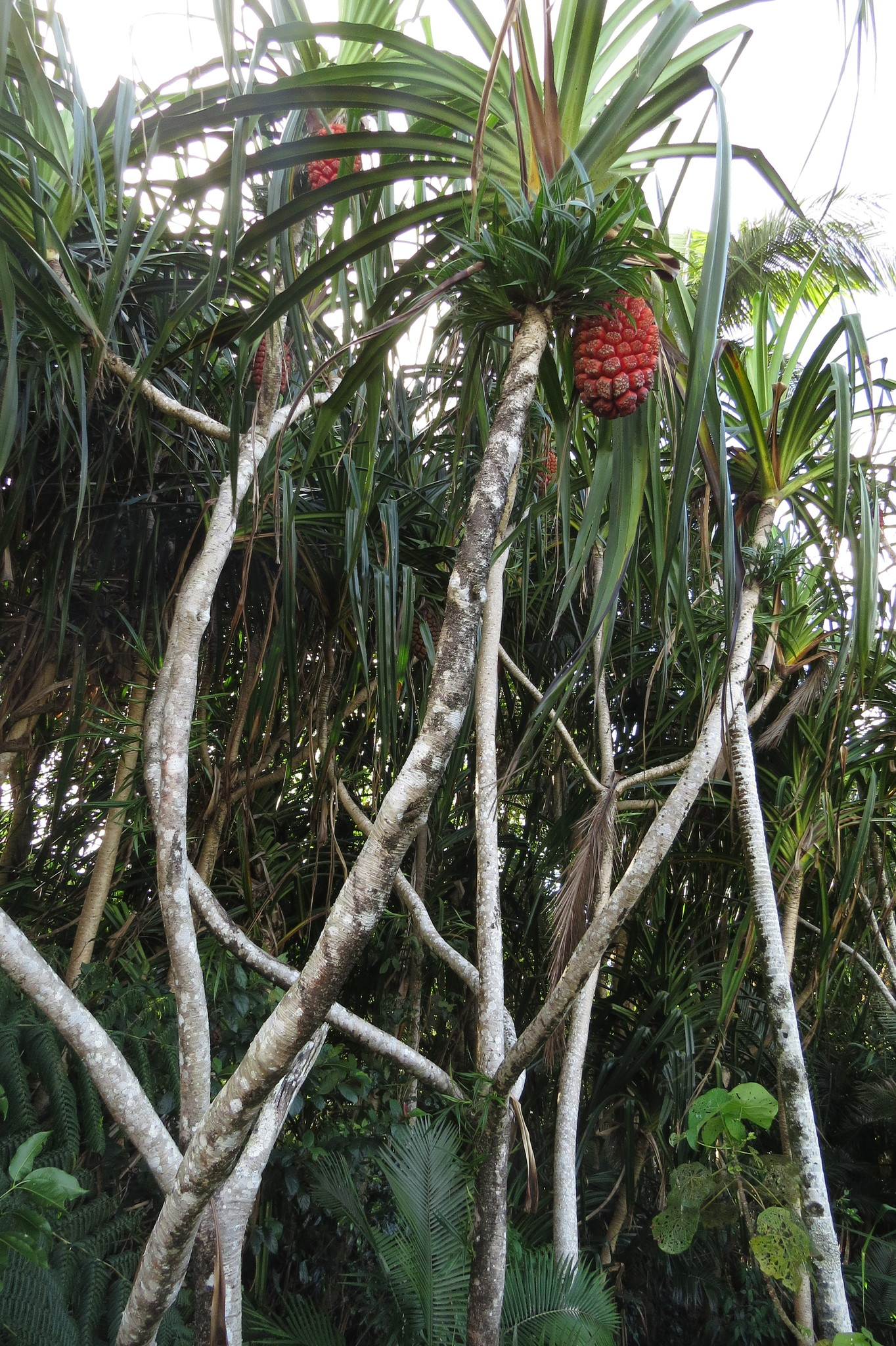

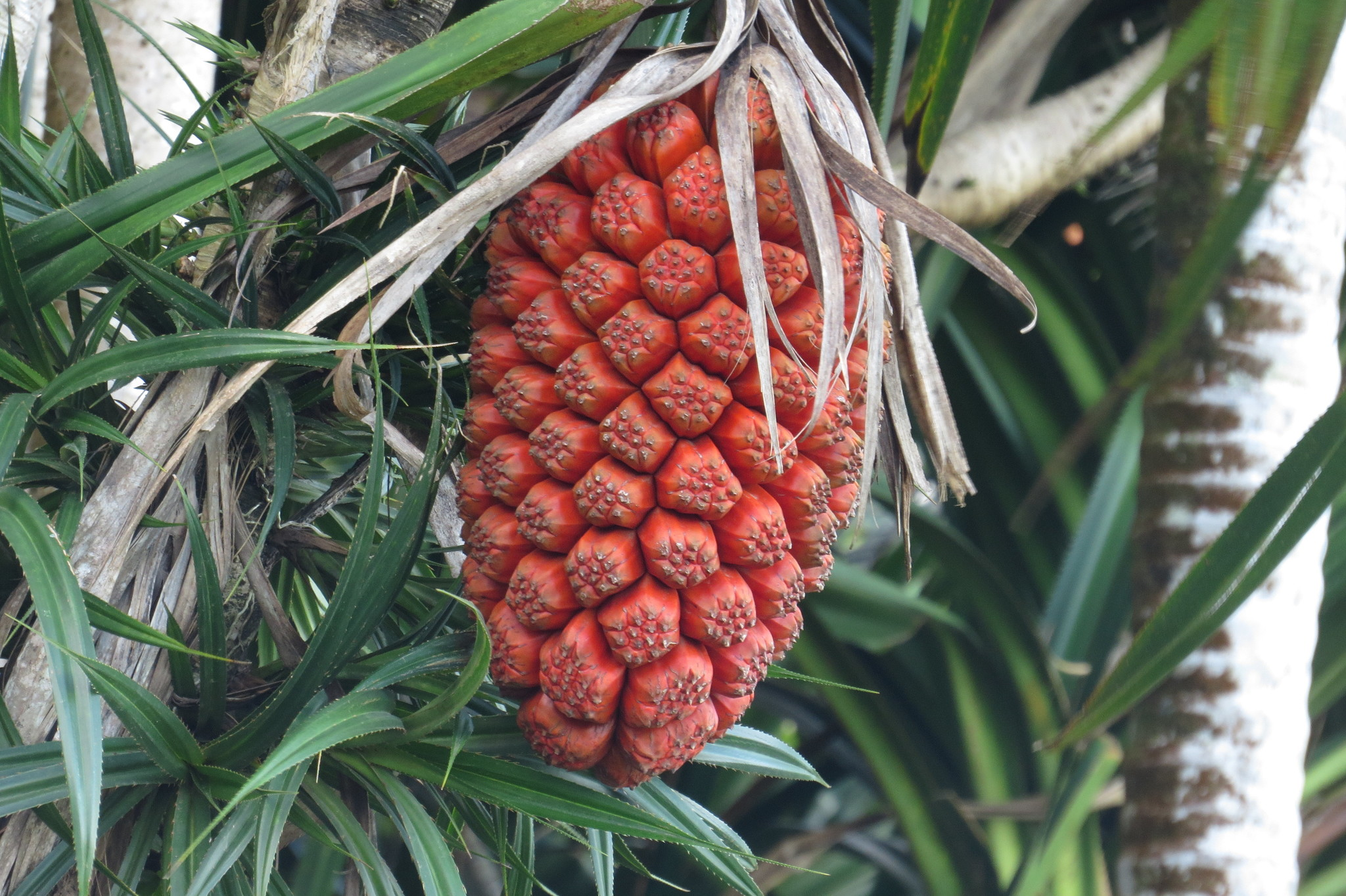
