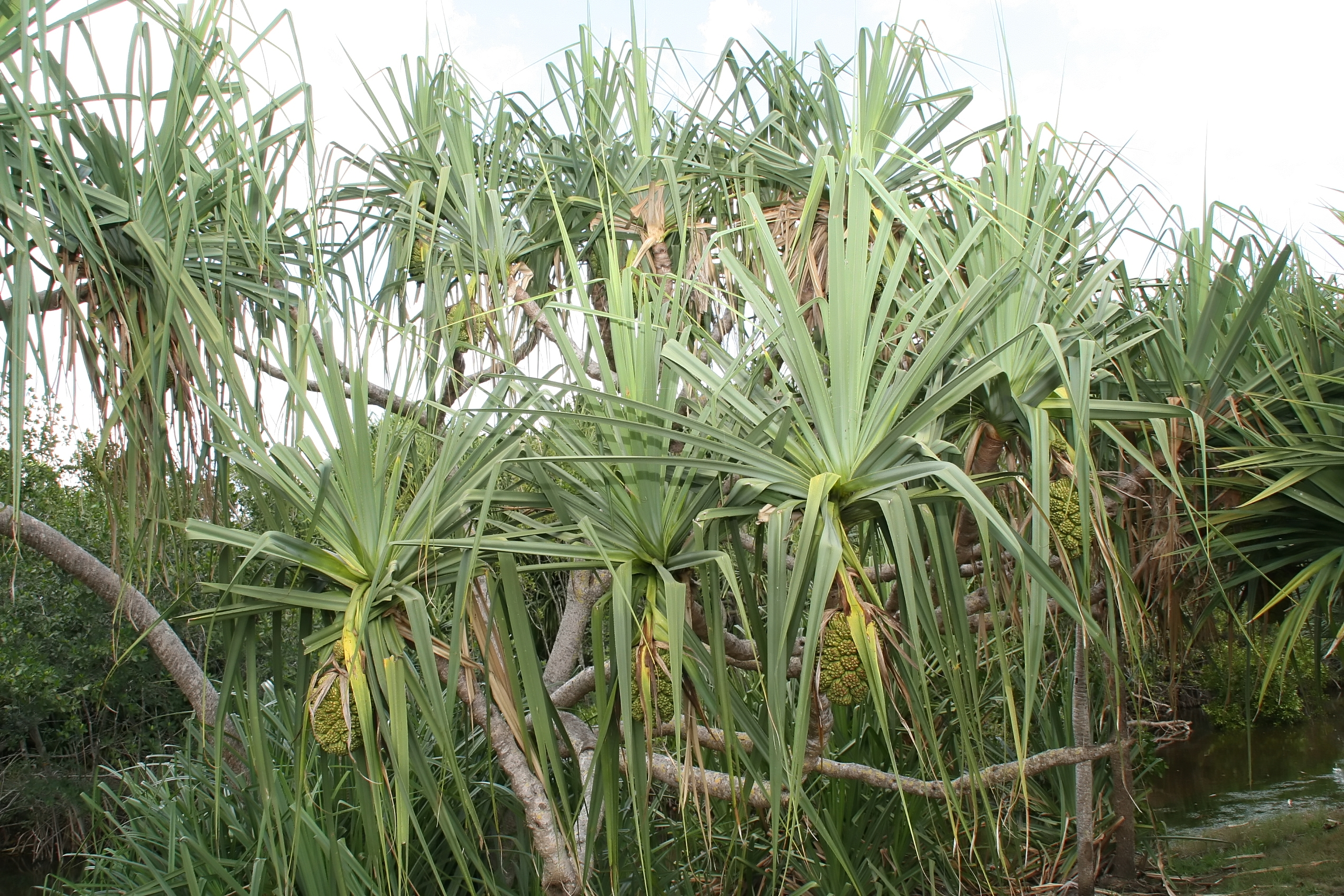

Conservation status
- Least Concern (NCA)
- Least Concern (IUCN 3.1)

Scientific classification
- Kingdom: Plantae
- Clade: Tracheophytes
- Clade: Angiosperms
- Clade: Monocots
- Order: Pandanales
- Family: Pandanaceae
- Genus: Pandanus
- Species: P. solms-laubachii

Binomial name
- Pandanus solms-laubachii F.Muell.

Synonyms
- Pandanus citraceus H.St.John; Pandanus kurandaensis H.St.John; Pandanus mossmanicus H.St.John; Pandanus multicarpelatus H.St.John; Pandanus nullumiae R.Tucker; Pandanus papillosus H.St.John; Pandanus punctatus H.St.John; Pandanus radicifer H.St.John; Pandanus rivularis H.St.John; Pandanus yalna R.Tucker

= Pandanus solms-laubachii =

Swamp pandan

Species of flowering plant

Pandanus solms-laubachii, commonly known as the swamp pandan, is a small tree in the family Pandanaceae which occurs in northeastern Queensland and possibly in Papua New Guinea. It is closely related to both Pandanus gemmifer and Pandanus grayorum.

== Description ==
Pandanus solms-laubachii is an evergreen tree usually growing up to about 10 m (33 ft) high, but may reach 20 m (66 ft) on occasions. It has an upright trunk around 15 cm (5.9 in) in diameter and an open, widely branching crown. The trunk has numerous warty nodules, which eventually become appressed vertical rootlets on older parts of the stems and branches.

The leaves are very long and narrow, arranged in tightly clustered spirals at the ends of the branches. They measure up to 2 m (6 ft 7 in) long and 8 cm (3.1 in) wide, with small ascending spines on the leaf margins and smaller spines on the underside of the midrib.

This species is dioecious, meaning that male and female flowers are born on different plants. The inflorescences are terminal and pendant, about 100 cm (39 in) long. Female flowers are grouped into segments known as phalanges, each of which contain 10-15 fused flowers. There may be up to 125 phalanges per inflorescence. The fruit is a syncarp, about 30 by 20 cm (11.8 by 7.9 in), pale orange when ripe with the phalanges conspicuous. At maturity the phalanges are woody and hard.

== Taxonomy ==
Pandanus solms-laubachii was first described in 1887 by the Victorian colonial botanist Ferdinand von Mueller, based on material collected by W. Persich from the Endeavour River on Cape York Peninsula. Mueller's paper describing the species, titled Neuer australischer Pandanus, was published in the journal Botanische Zeitung

=== Etymology ===
The species epithet "solms-laubachii" was created by Mueller in honour of the German botanist Hermann zu Solms-Laubach.

== Distribution and habitat ==
The swamp pandan is considered to be endemic to Queensland by both Plants of the World Online and Australian Tropical Rainforest Plants, but the treatment at Flora of Australia states that it is also found in Papua New Guinea. The Australasian Virtual Herbarium has a single record of this species in Papua New Guinea from 1936. In Australia it occurs from the areas around Mapoon and Lockhart River in Cape York Peninsula, spreading southwards along the east coast to Hinchinbrook Island.

Within this range the preferred habitat of the species is lowland swamp forests, although it also occurs in gallery forests, rainforests, vine thickets and woodlands, from near sea level up to 500 m (1,600 ft).

In the lower reaches of the Mulgrave and Russell rivers, it co-occurs with its close relative Pandanus grayorum.

== Ecology ==
Pandanus solms-laubachii, along with Pandanus tectorius and Benstonea monticola, is a host plant for the peppermint stick insect (Megacrania batesii), which shelters in the central hollow of the leaves and feeds on them. Red-tailed black cockatoos (Calyptorhynchus banksii) and various native rats are able to gnaw through the hard woody phalanges to access the seeds. The larvae of the banana scab moth (Nacoleia octasema) may attack the fruits of this species.

== Conservation ==
This species is listed by both the Queensland Department of Environment and Science and the International Union for Conservation of Nature (IUCN) as least concern. The IUCN provides the following summary as the justification for the classification: "This tree species has a wide distribution and is not currently experiencing any major threats and no significant future threats have been identified. This species is therefore assessed as Least Concern".

== Uses ==
Like many other species of this genus, the swamp pandan has been used historically for a variety of purposes. The long leaves are easily torn into long strips and used for weaving of baskets, bags, mats, sails, etc, and various other parts of the plant are used for medicines.

== Gallery ==
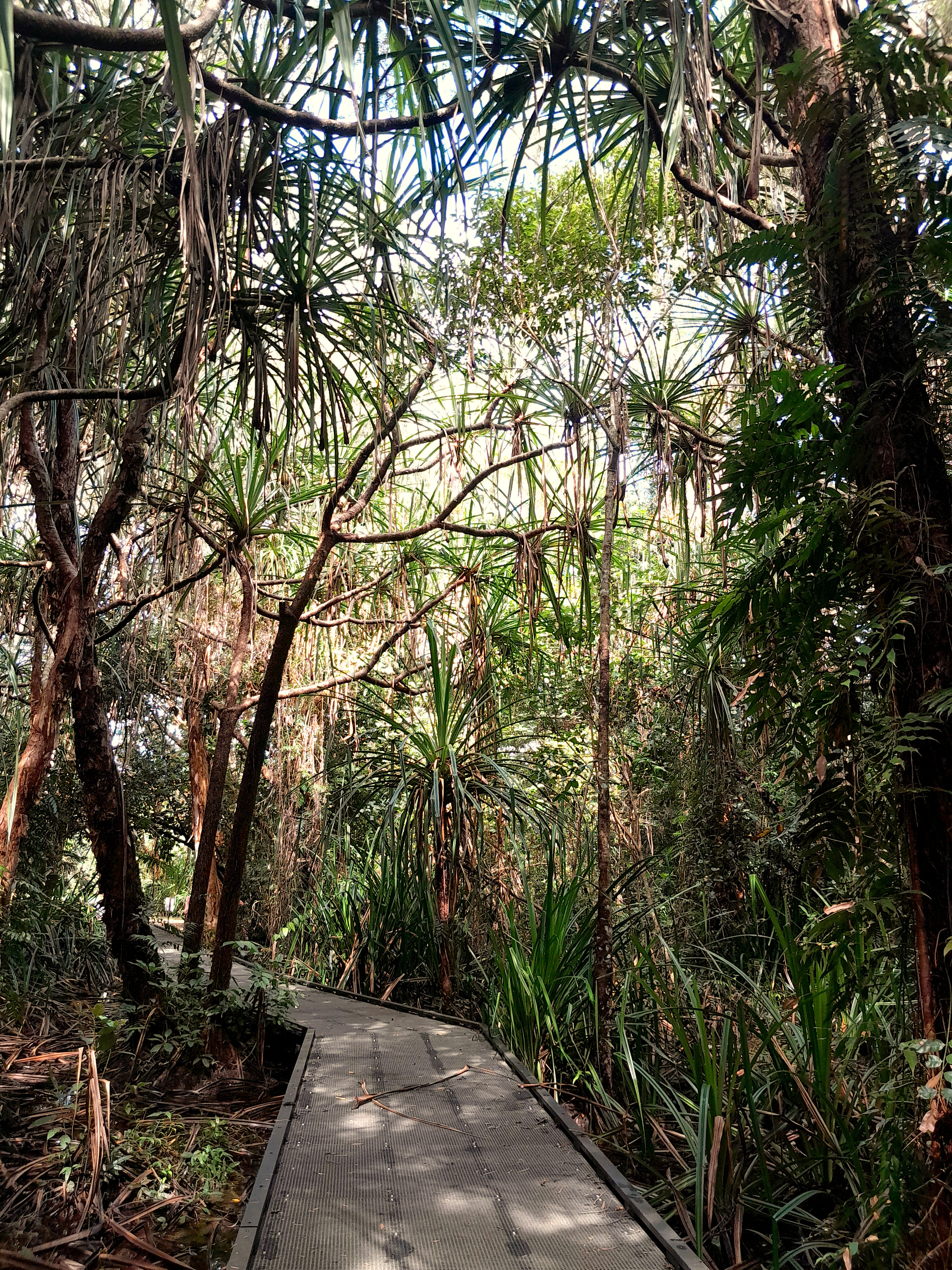
Growing in swampland near the Cairns Botanic Gardens. March 2023

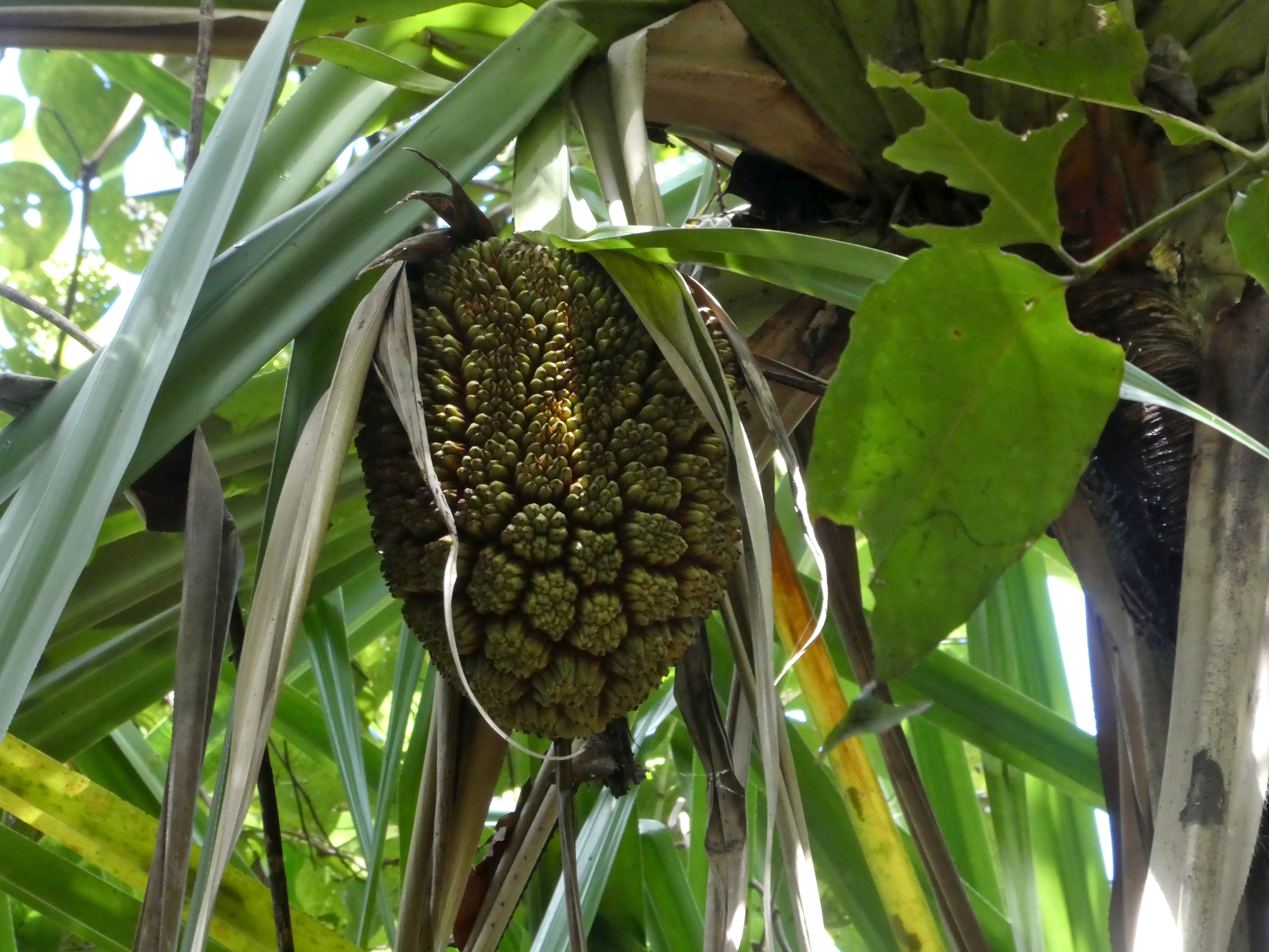
Fruit, with conspicuous phalanges.

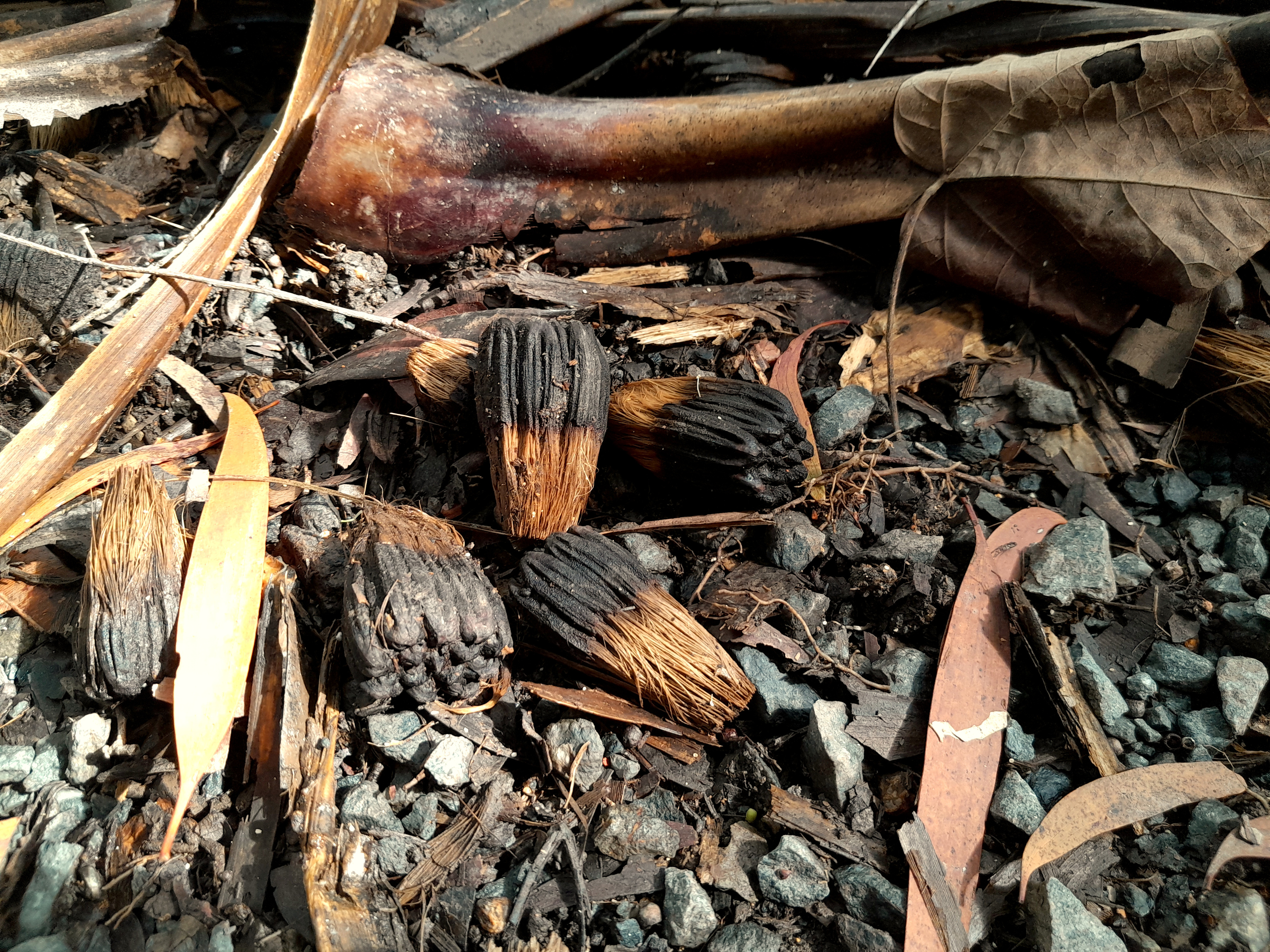
Old phalanges from the previous fruiting season. Cairns, March 2023

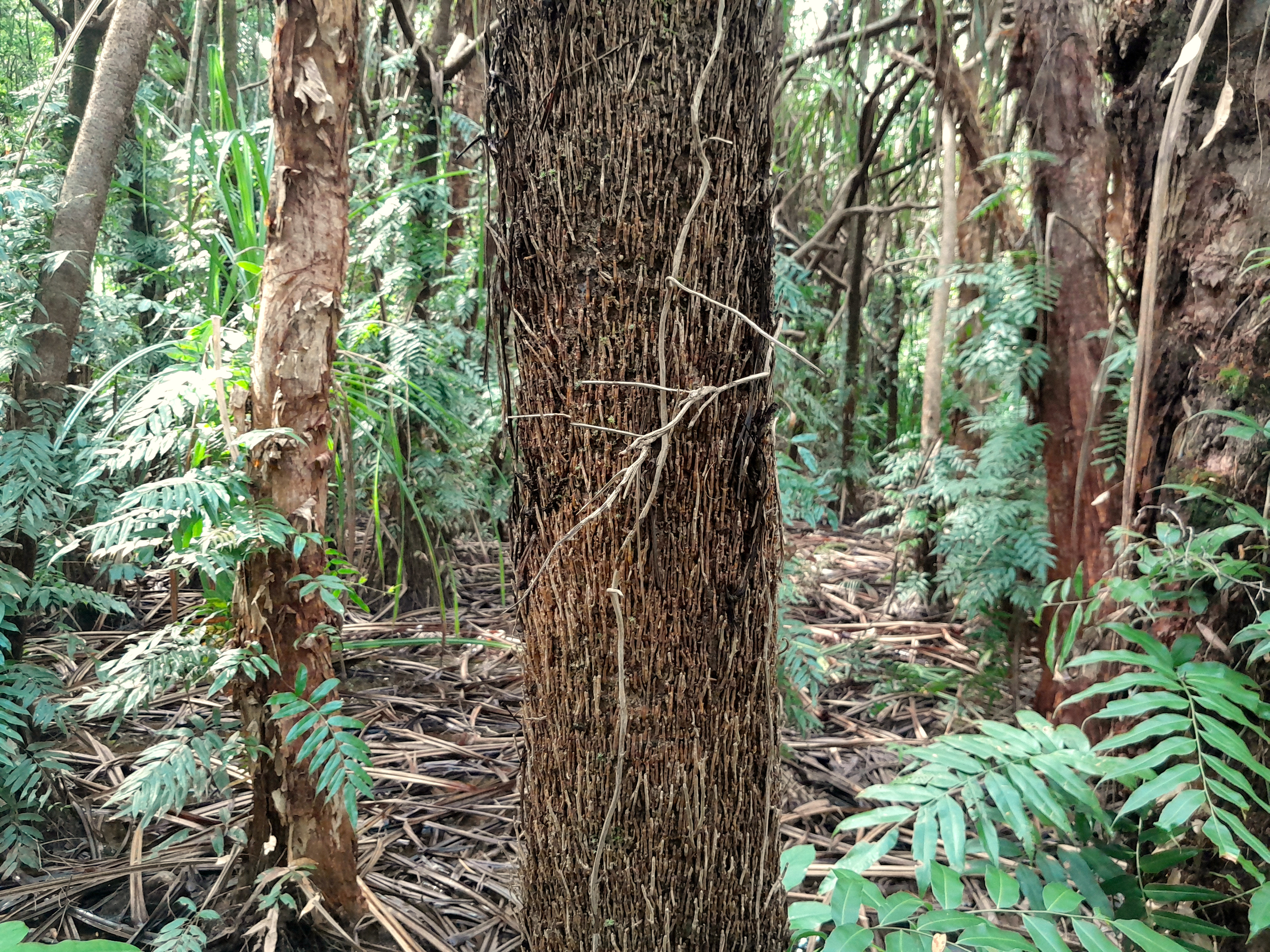
Trunk with dense covering of ascending rootlets.

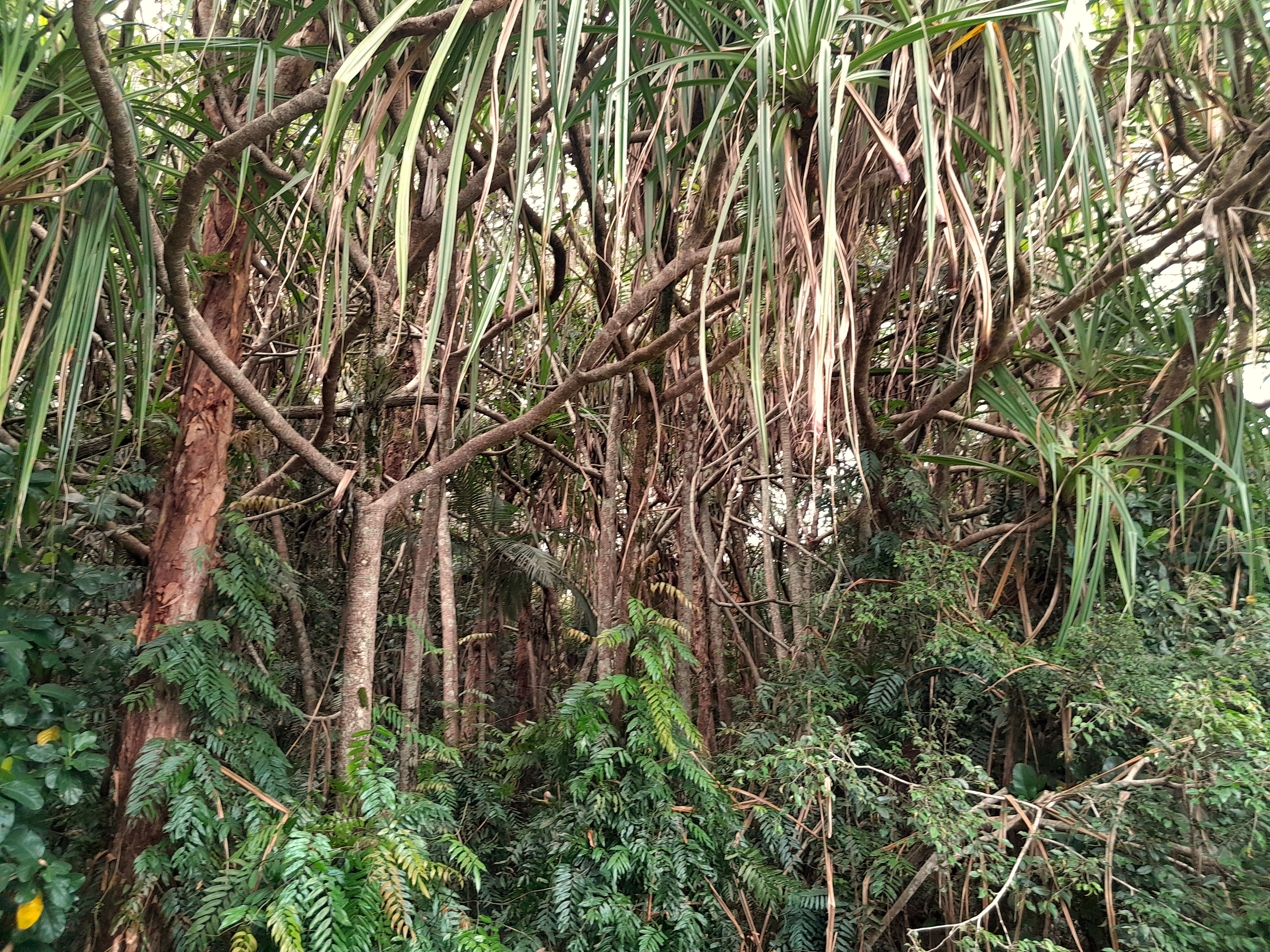

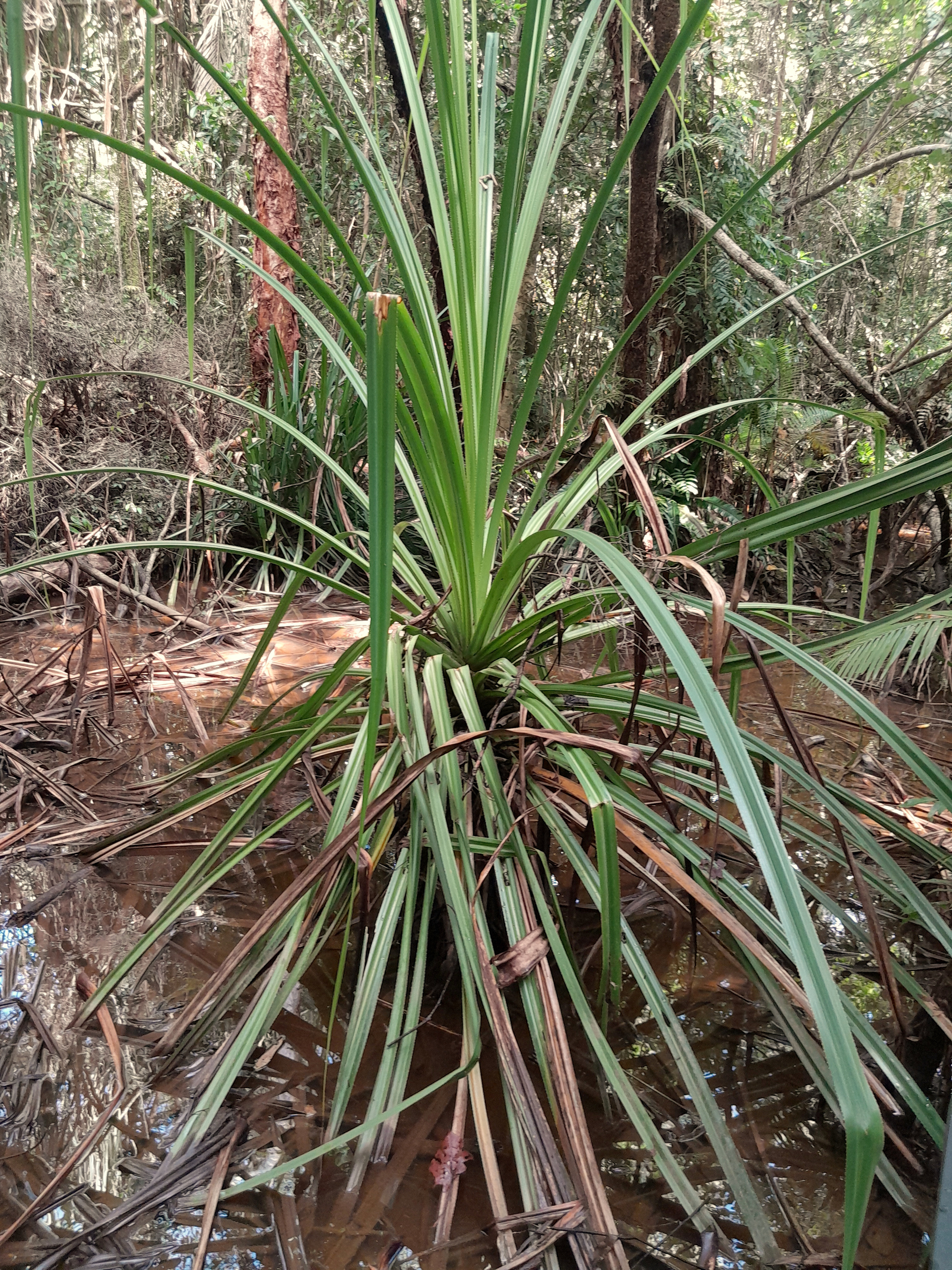
Young plant

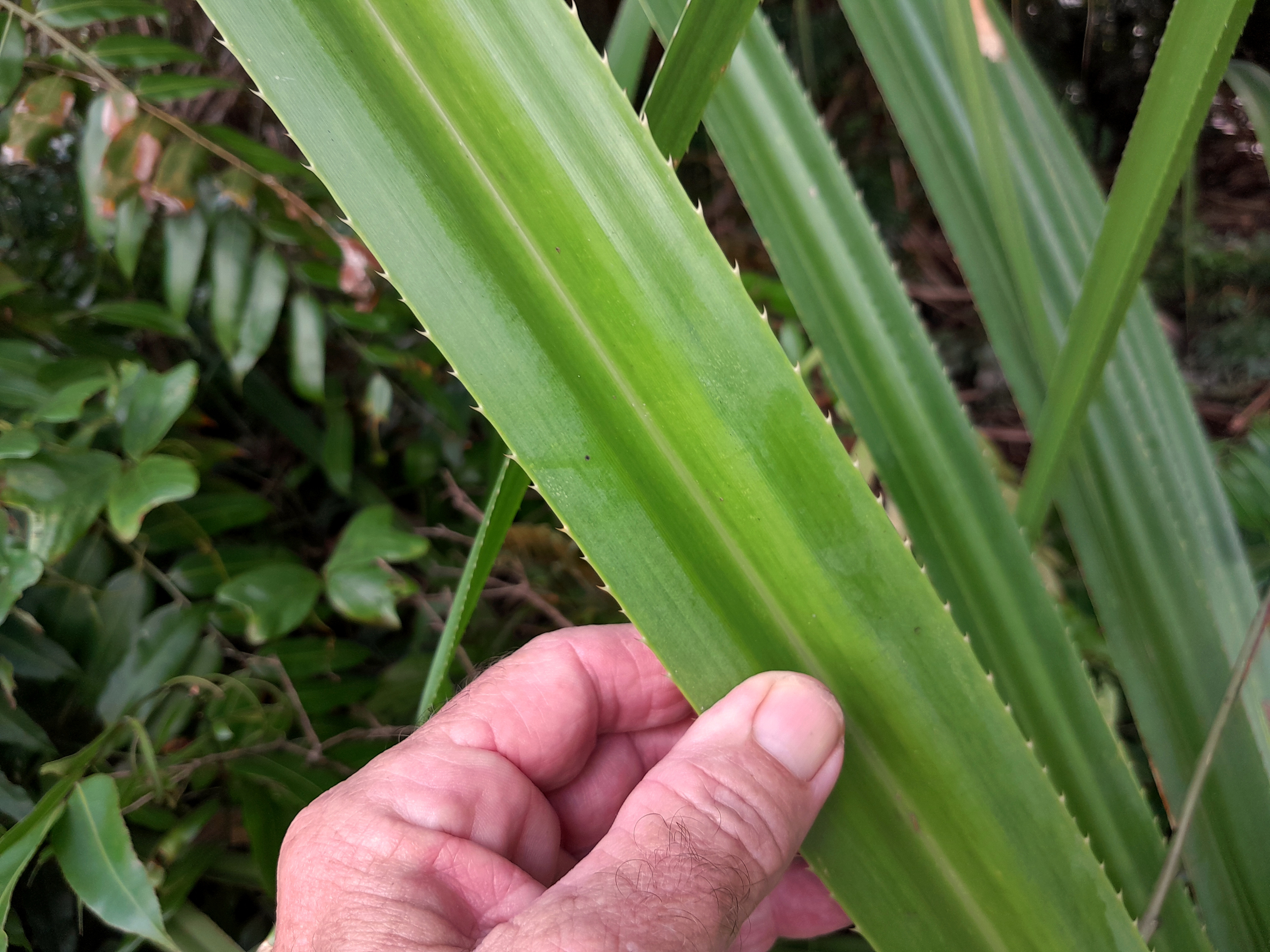
Close up of leaf

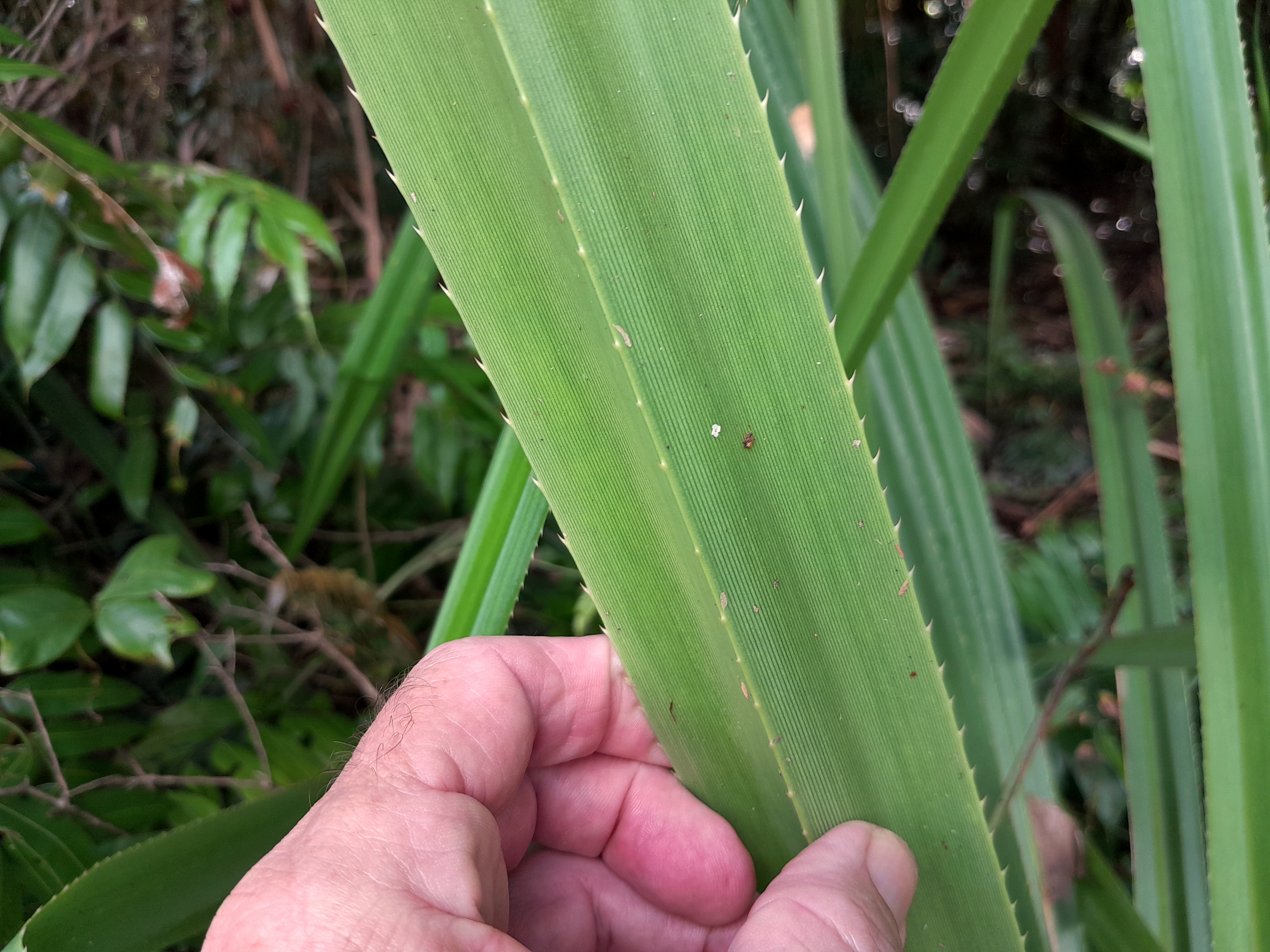
Close up of leaf, underside
