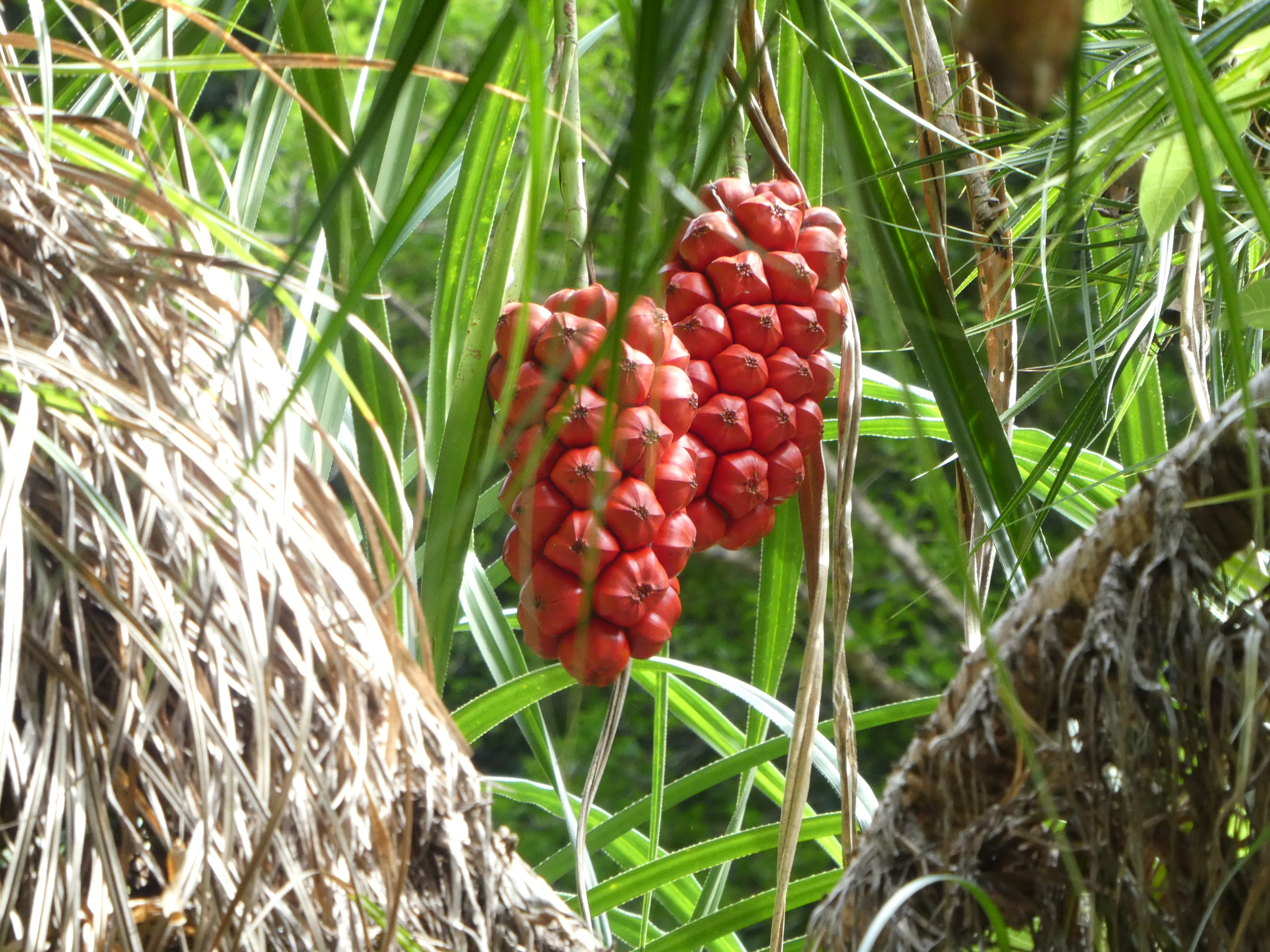
- Mature fruit

Conservation status
- Least Concern (NCA)

Scientific classification
- Kingdom: Plantae
- Clade: Tracheophytes
- Clade: Angiosperms
- Clade: Monocots
- Order: Pandanales
- Family: Pandanaceae
- Genus: Pandanus
- Species: P. gemmifer

Binomial name
- Pandanus gemmifer H.St.John

= Pandanus gemmifer =

Pup pandan

Species of flowering plant

Pandanus gemmifer, commonly known as pup pandan, is a plant in the family Pandanaceae that is endemic to northeast Queensland. It is closely related to Pandanus grayorum and Pandanus solms-laubachii.

== Description ==
Pandanus gemmifer is an evergreen tree growing up to 10 m (33 ft) high with a trunk up to 15 cm (5.9 in) diameter. It has a very open structure, long branches and prop (or stilt) roots up to 50 cm (20 in) high emanating from the lower portion of the trunk. Like P. grayorum the stem is marked with spirally arranged nodules, which may eventually develop into "pups" or plantlets on the upper reaches of the branches. In this species the pups are numerous and densely packed, and the branches may be completely obscured by them.

Leaves are clustered at the ends of the branches, arching, "M" shaped in cross-section and measure up to 300 cm (120 in) long or more by 5 cm (2.0 in) wide at the base, tapering gradually along the full length to a fine point. Ascending spurs occur along the leaf margins around the midsection of the leaf, and on the apex margins and midrib.

The inflorescences are terminal and pendant. The fruit is a syncarp, dark red when ripe and divided into 30 to 40 segments. Each segment contains up to 17 carpels, has a more or less domed upper surface, the apex of which is marked by the small crowded tips of the carpels.

== Taxonomy ==
This species was first described in 1962 by the American botanist Harold St. John. His paper, titled "Revision of the genus Pandanus Stickman, Part 9, Three new Pandanus species from Queensland, Australia", was published in the journal Pacific Science. The type specimen was collected at "Fresh Water Creek, moist forest by stream, near intake, 500 ft. alt.", an area now known as Crystal Cascades.

== Etymology ==
St. John stated in his paper that the species epithet gemmifer is from "the Latin, gemma, a bud; fero, to produce; in reference to the spectacular production of lateral, leafy buds."

== Distribution and habitat ==
Pandanus gemmifer is restricted to northeast Queensland, occurring in disjunct populations near Coen on Cape York Peninsula, around Cairns and the Atherton Tablelands, and in the Paluma Range National Park.

== Conservation ==
This species is listed by the Queensland Department of Environment and Science as least concern. As of 25 February 2023, it has not been assessed by the IUCN.

== Gallery ==
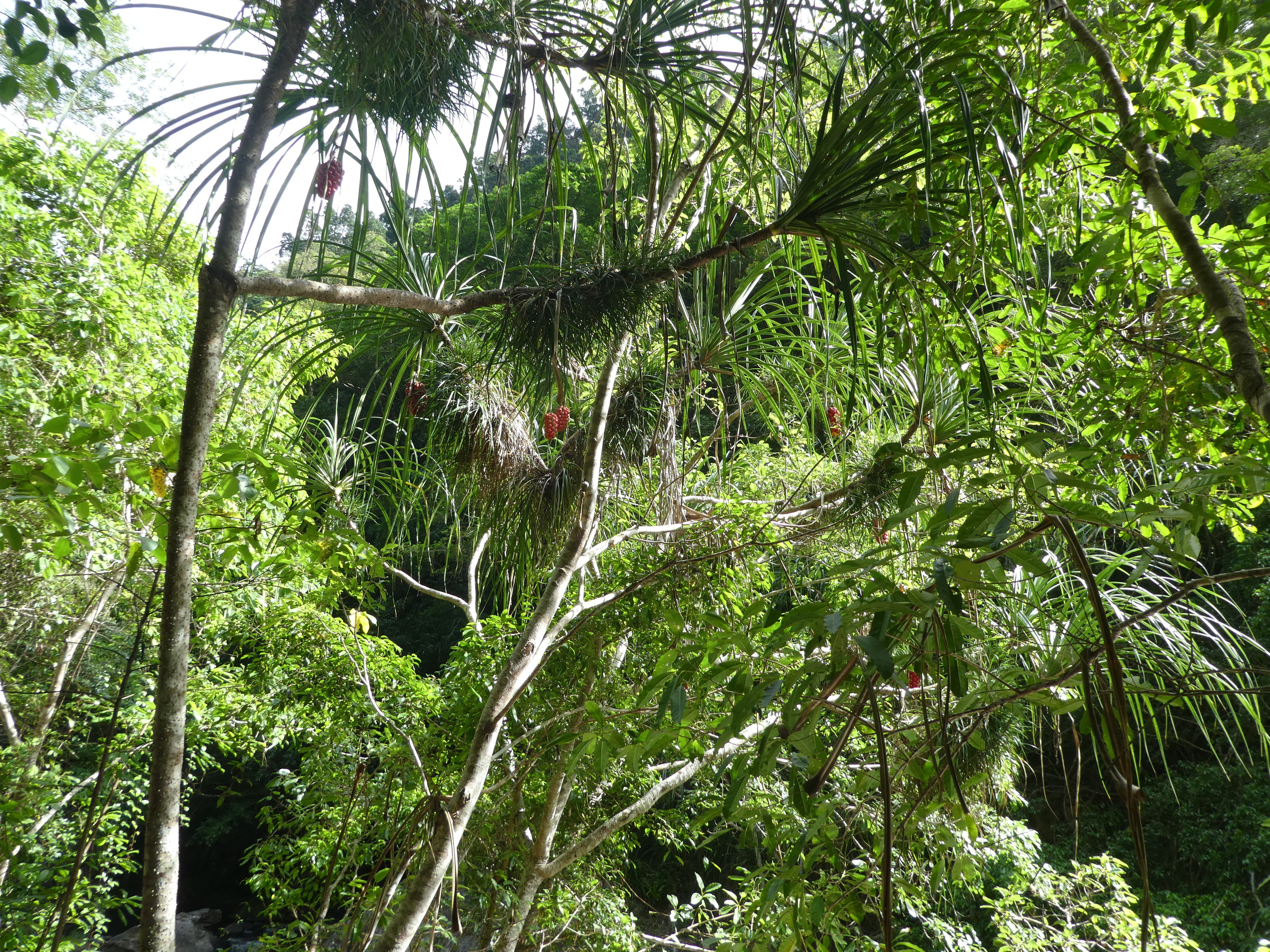
Mature trees at Crystal Cascades showing open structure

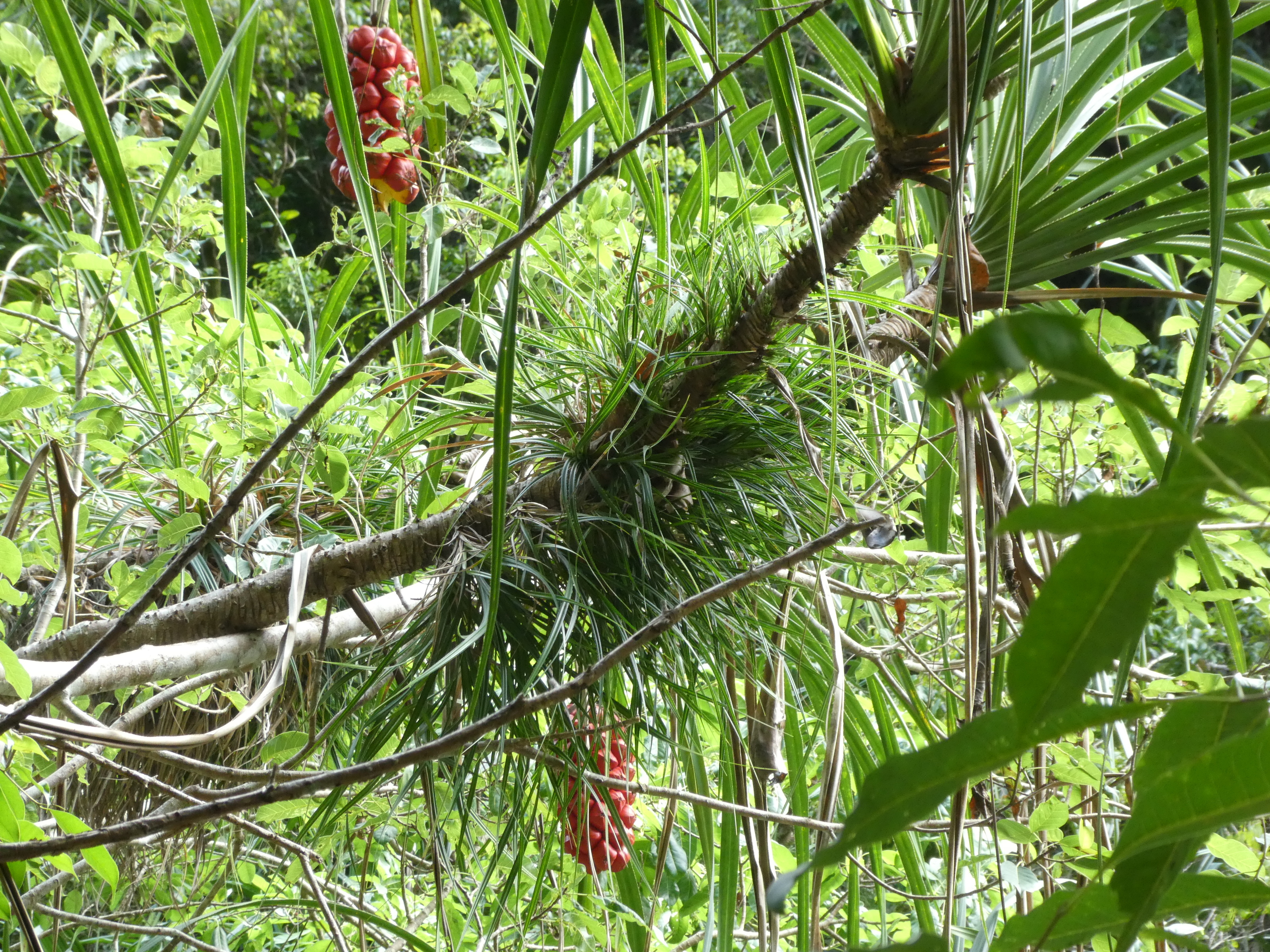
Densely packed "pups" on upper branches

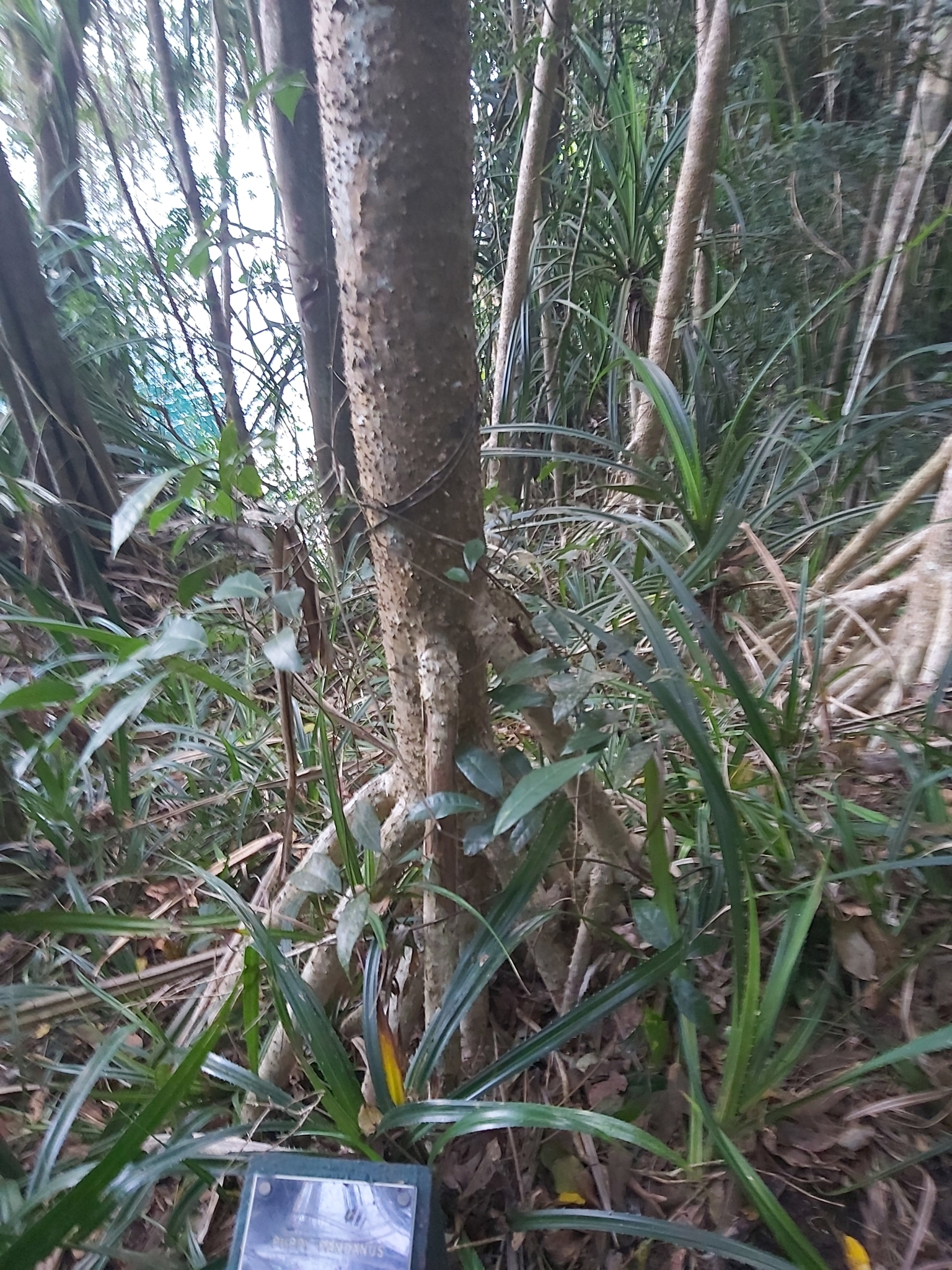
Prop roots

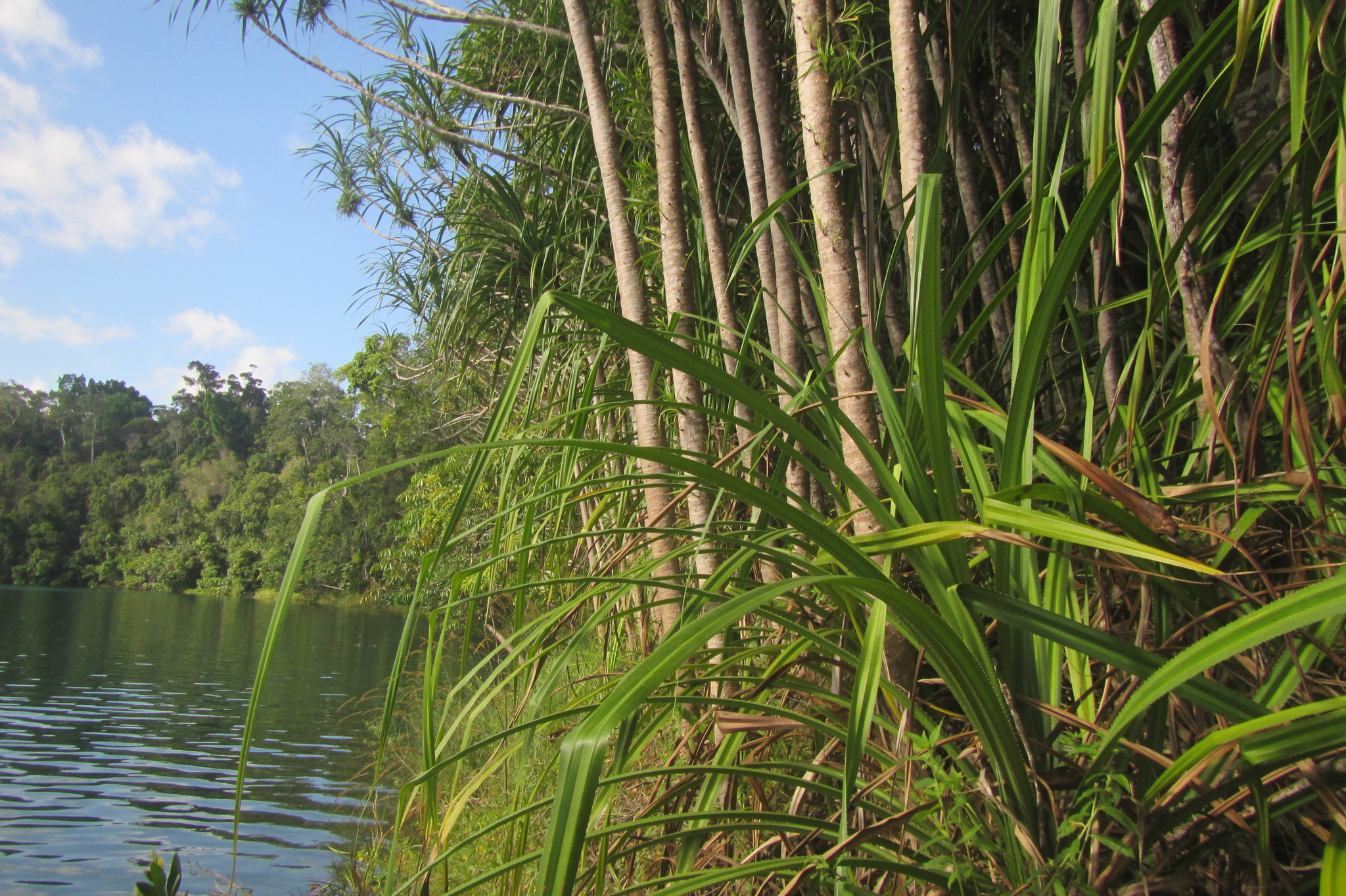
Dense stand alongside Lake Eachan, January 2019
