= Methyl homodaphniphyllate =

- Skeletal structure of (+)-methyl homodaphniphyllate

Names
- IUPAC name methyl 3-[(1S,2R,3S,7R,10S,13S,14R)-1-methyl-14-propan-2-yl-12-azapentacyclo[8.6.0.0^{2,13}.0^{3,7}.0^{7,12}]hexadecan-2-yl]propanoate
- Other names: (+)-Homodaphniphyllic acid methyl; Methyl homodaphniphyllate acid; Daphnan-23-oic acid methyl ester

Identifiers
CAS Number	23496-03-9
3D model (JSmol)	Interactive image
PubChem CID	102058172
- InChI: InChI=1S/C23H37NO2/c1-15(2)17-8-11-21(3)16-7-12-22-10-5-6-18(22)23(21,13-9-19(25)26-4)20(17)24(22)14-16/h15-18,20H,5-14H2,1-4H3/t16-,17-,18-,20+,21+,22-,23+/m1/s1 Key: NTGCSTZYSQEIFW-KRCCOEDOSA-N
- SMILES: CC(C)[C@H]1CC[C@]2([C@@H]3CC[C@]45CCC[C@H]4[C@]2([C@H]1N5C3)CCC(=O)OC)C

Properties
Chemical formula	C_{23}H_{37}NO_{2}
Molar mass	359.554 g·mol^{−1}
Melting point	233–234 °C (451–453 °F; 506–507 K)
- Except where otherwise noted, data are given for materials in their standard state (at 25 °C [77 °F], 100 kPa). Infobox references

Methyl homodaphniphyllate is a polycyclic molecule belonging to the substance class terpenoid-alkaloids, of which it is the subtype Daphniphyllum-alkaloid, a type of triterpenoid-alkaloid. It is found in the fruits of the shrub Daphniphyllum macropodum. As of yet the effects and biological purpose of this molecule are unknown. However, related molecules in the Daphniphyllum-Alkaloid class show cytotoxic behavior against multiple human cancer cell lines.

Methyl homodaphniphyllate contains a 2-azabicyclo[3.3.1.]nonane system, characteristic of the Daphniphyllum-alkaloids. Of the Daphniphyllum-alkaloids it has the Daphniphylline skeletal structure due to the identical pentacyclic nucleus but differing C-14 substituents. The C-14 substituent on methyl homodaphniphyllate is methyl acetate. This molecule is chiral and the carbon connecting the polycylic ring structure to the substituent arm with methyl acetate is the chiral center. The (+) form rotates clockwise in polarized light. It is possible that methyl homodaphniphyllate is an intermediate between Daphniphylline and other Daphniphyllum-alkaloids in biosynthesis.

== History ==
The first total synthesis of (+)-methyl homodaphniphyllate was performed by Clayton H. Heathcock and his team in 1986 and involves several synthetic steps characterized by repeated ring-closing reactions, ultimately yielding a complex polycyclic alkaloid. Heathcock and others have further researched the synthesis of this molecule to explore the 2-azadiene Diels-Alder cyclization.
