= Daphniphyllum griffithianum =

Scientific classification
- Kingdom: Plantae
- Clade: Embryophytes
- Clade: Tracheophytes
- Clade: Spermatophytes
- Clade: Angiosperms
- Clade: Eudicots
- Order: Saxifragales
- Family: Daphniphyllaceae
- Genus: Daphniphyllum
- Species: D. griffithianum

Binomial name
- Daphniphyllum griffithianum (Wight) Noltie

Synonyms
- Daphniphyllum bancanum Kurz; Daphniphyllum laurinum (Benth.) Baill.; Goughia griffithiana Wight; Goughia laurina Benth.; Gyrandra laurina Wall.

Species of shrub from Indonesia to Thailand

Daphniphyllum griffithianum is a tree species in the family Daphniphyllaceae. It is native to an area from Nusa Tenggara, Indonesia, to Thailand.

== Taxonomy ==
The species is in section Lunata of Daphniphyllum, along with D. calycinum and D. majus.

This current species was described by the botanist Henry John Noltie (born 1957) in 2005, in the publication Regnum Vegatibile: a Series of Handbooks for the Use of Plant Taxonomists and Plant Geographers (Utrecht). This was a re-working of the taxa, originally named by the Scottish surgeon and botanist Robert Wight (1796–1872) as Goughia griffithiana in 1852. Wight was a leading plant taxonomist of South India.

== Distribution ==
It is native to an area from Nusa Tenggara, Indonesia to Thailand. Countries and regions that it has been recorded are: Indonesia (Nusa Tenggara, Kalimantan, Sumatera); Malaysia (Sabah, Sarawak, Peninsular Malaysia); and Thailand.

== Habitat and ecology ==
The species is of low-moderate abundance in the peat swamp forest of PT National Sago Prima of PT Sampoerna Agro tbk, Kepulauan Meranti Regency, Riau Province, Sumatera. This forest was logged some 28 years before study. This is enough time for the vegetation community to return to primary forest but there is still a considerable presence of secondary forest taxa. The most important taxa at the time of study were Benstonea atrocarpa and Blumeodendron subrotundifolium
