= Wando Arboretum =

Arboretum in South Jeolla, South Korea

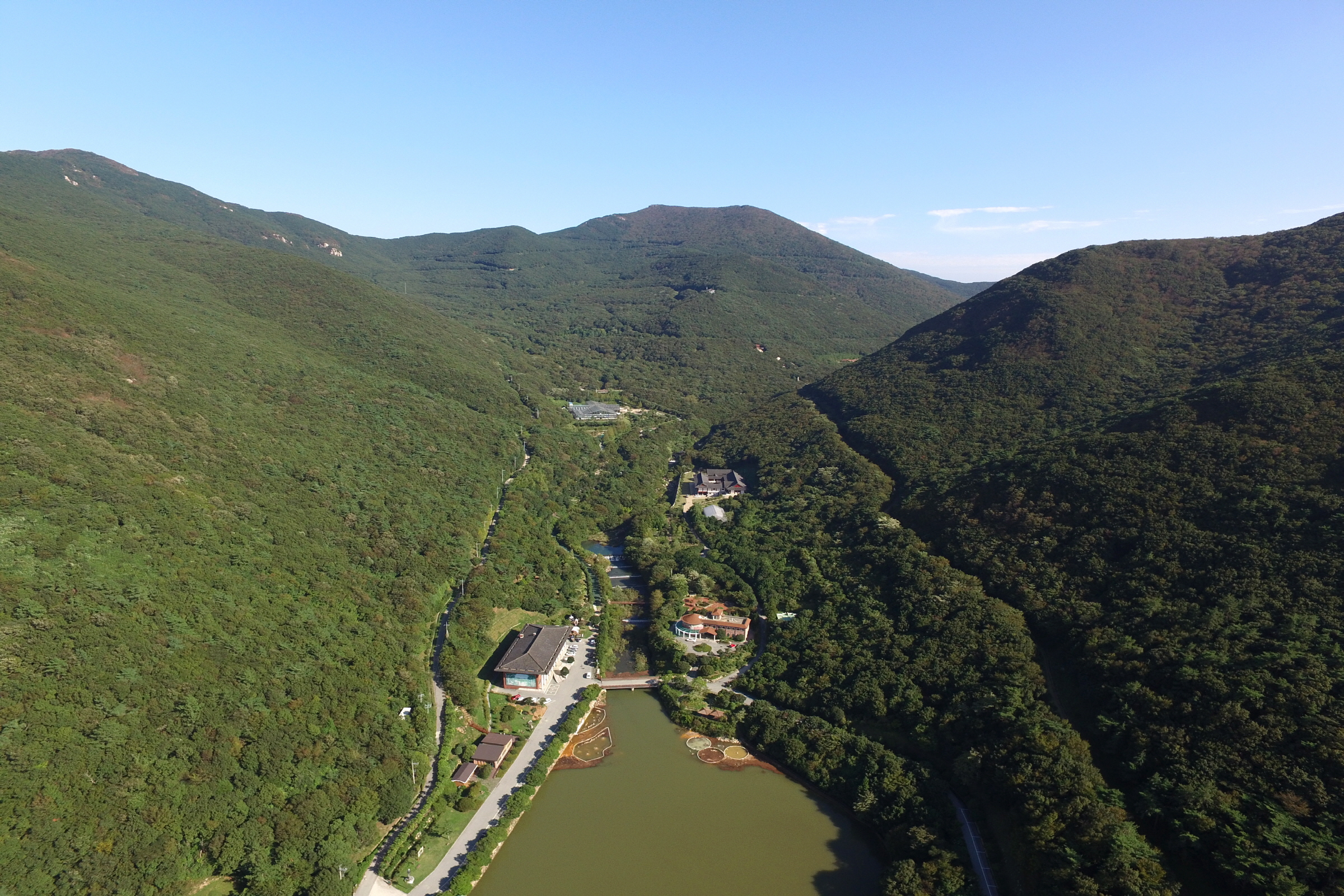
Aerial photography of Wando Arboretum

Wando Arboretum (Korean: 완도수목원) is a public arboretum in Daemun-ri, Gunoe-myeon, Wando County, Jeonnam-Gwangju, South Korea. It is South Korea's only arboretum with an area of 2,050ha in the warm temperate zone and the country's largest natural habitat for warm temperate forest.

Created with a view to providing opportunities to enjoy quality forest, culture, and recreation by presenting models for humans life and effects of forest, Wando Arboretum is located in the warm temperate zone that takes up 15% of the South Korean territory.

Warm temperate zone refers to the unique evergreen broadleaf forest that is seen in those mildest regions of Korea at 35 degrees northern latitude or below with shorter daily temperature ranges and heavy rainfall such as south coast, Jeju Island, and Ulleungdo(hangul:울릉도), which register annual minimum average temperature of 14 °C, minimum average January temperature of 0 °C, precipitation of 1,300-1,500mm.

The arboretum is a house that parades in about 2,000ha a natural evergreen broadleaf forest that has value for landscape, dietetics, and pharmacology such as camellia, Castanopsis cuspidata, Ilex integra, Machilus, Daphniphyllum macropodum, and red thorn.

== Key Facilities ==
The total area of the arboretum is 2,050ha and has 3,801 plant species. 752 of these are autochthonous ones including warm temperate species, and 2,876 species are in some 30 specialized branches that preserve and exhibits plant species collected morphologically and taxonomically.

Its major specialized branches include garden of variegated plants, garden of Incense plants, garden of aquatic plant, local craft center, camellia garden, and needleleaf garden.

The 3,196m^{2} sub-tropic greenhouse splits into tropic & sub-tropic garden that exhibits some 200 species such as Palm trees, Foliage plants, Tropical fruits, and Herbs, and Cacti & succulent plant garden that displays 300 or so varieties of cacti.

Besides, the arboretum includes forest museum, forest environment education center, education and administration building, observatory, and warm temperate forest trail.
