= Käthe Rosenthal =

German botanist and teacher

- Born: Käthe Emmy Rosenthal; June 25, 1893; Breslau
- Died: September 8, 1942 (aged 49); Riga Ghetto, Lettland
- Cause of death: Murder
- Resting place: unknown
- Citizenship: German
- Education: Schlesischen Friedrich-Wilhelms-Universität zu Breslau
- Scientific career
- Fields: Botany
- Workplaces: Breslau University Botanical Garden
- Thesis: Monographie der Gattung Daphniphyllum ("Monograph of the genus Daphniphyllum") (1916)
- Author abbrev. (botany): K.Rosenth.

Käthe Rosenthal (1893–1942) was a German botanist. Her major work was on the genus Daphniphyllum. She worked at the Silesian Friedrich-Wilhelms-University in Breslau and at the Prussian Academy of Sciences in Berlin. At the beginning of September 1942, the Jewish scientist was deported from her place of residence in Berlin to the Riga Ghetto, where she was murdered a few days later.

== Early life ==
Käthe Emmy Rosenthal was born on 25 June 1893, in the then German city of Breslau (now Wrocław in Poland). Her parents were Amalie, née Kaufmann (1858-1911) and Rabbi Ferdinand Rosenthal (1839-1921; Amalie Kaufman was his second wife). Her mother was born in what is now Kojetín in the Czech Republic. Her father was born in what is now Kaposvár in Hungary. He had studied at Leipzig and Berlin universities, and attained a Doctor of Philosophy. He was a rabbi in then Beuthen, now Bytom in Silesia, Poland from 1867 and in Breslau from 1887. He published five works (e.g. see Sefer haYashar (Rabbeinu Tam)). Käthe Rosenthal grew up in the city of Breslau with four half- and full-brothers: Benjamin Willy (born 1880); Immanuel Felix (born 1885); Bruno Isachar (born 1886); and Walter David (born 1905). She attended Hönigersche Privatschule (Höniger private school), and passed her matriculation examination (Reifeprüfung) at the Realgymnasialen Studienanstalt (secondary school) of the city's Viktoriaschule.

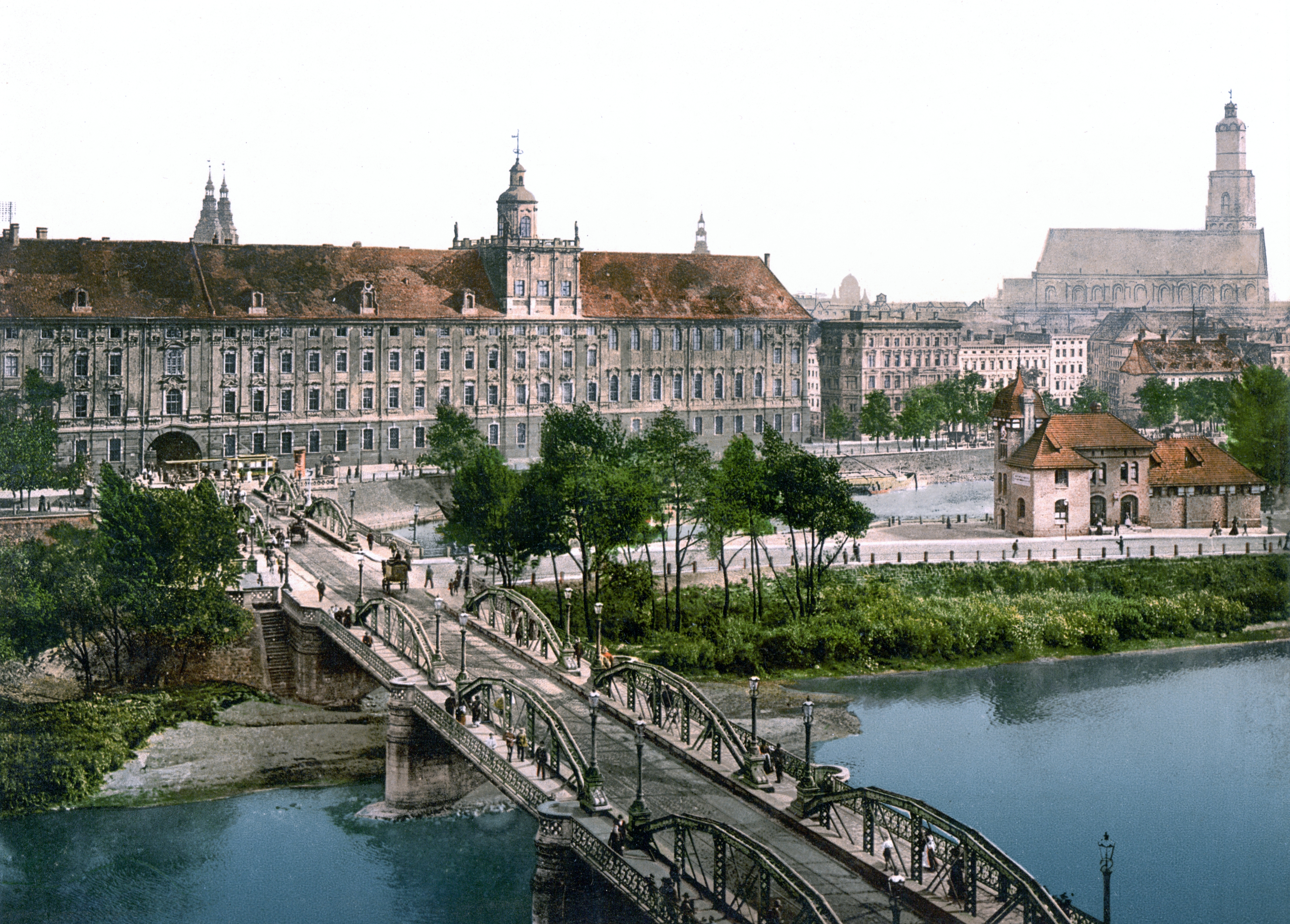
Silesian Friedrich Wilhelm University in Breslau

From Easter in 1912, Rosenthal studied natural sciences and philosophy at the Schlesischen Friedrich-Wilhelms-Universität (Silesian Friedrich-Wilhelms-University) in Breslau. Her teachers included Alexander von Lingelsheim, Ferdinand Albin Pax and Georg Kükenthal.

She retained her birth name through her life; she did not marry.

== Career ==
From 1 October 1915, Rosenthal worked as an assistant at the Botanical Garden and Museum of Schlesischen Friedrich-Wilhelms-Universität. In 1916 she completed her Ph.D. within the Philosophy faculty with a thesis entitled Monographie der Gattung Daphniphyllum ("Monograph of the genus Daphniphyllum"). Her advisers were Prof. Dr. Hans Winkler, Dozenten (Lecturer) Dr. Alexander von Lingelsheim, and Käthe Hoffmann.

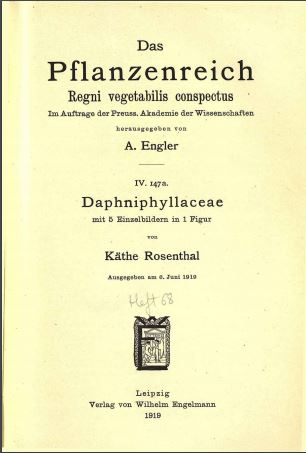
Käthe Rosenthal's book on Daphniphyllaceae in Adolf Engler's publication Das Pflanzenreich (1919)

Her thesis focused on the plant genus Daphniphyllum, the only genus within the Daphniphyllaceae family. She described eight new species of Daphniphyllum that were native to South and Southeast Asia. Both alone and together with her former teacher Ferdinand A. Pax, she contributed numerous scientific articles in Adolf Engler's multi-volume publication Das Planzenreich, which originally had aimed to cover all plant species on earth.

Some time after this she worked for the Preußische Akademie der Wissenschaften (Prussian Academy of Sciences) in Berlin.

== Last years and murder ==
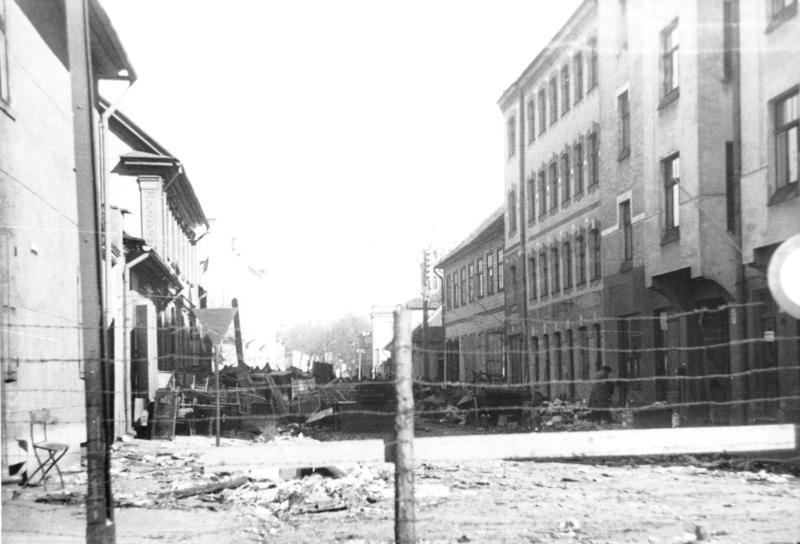
Riga Ghetto in 1942

After the name change ordinance of the National Socialist regime of Germany, from 1 January 1939, she was forced to use the Jewish-signifying first name Sara as well as her actual name.

In 1942 she was living in 67 Seesener Strasse, Halensee locality, southeast Berlin. Together with several hundred other Berlin Jews she was deported to the Riga Ghetto, in then German-controlled Lettland, now the nation of Latvia, on the 5 September 1942. There immediately after their arrival on 8 September, as part of the systematic Nazi extermination of Jews, she and her fellows were murdered. She was 49 years of age.

== Relationship to Käthe Hoffmann ==
Käthe Hoffmann was a botanist who worked at the university in Breslau. Over the years there has been confusion over the identity of these two Breslau women botanists. Hoffmann was older than Rosenthal, advised her, and co-published with her.

== Taxa described ==
The standard author abbreviation K.Rosenth. is used to indicate this person as the author when citing a botanical name.

- Daphniphyllum bengalense K.Rosenth., now a synonym for Daphniphyllum chartaceum K.Rosenth.
- Daphniphyllum celebense K.Rosenth.
- Daphniphyllum chartaceum K.Rosenth.
- Daphniphyllum formosanum K.Rosenth., now a synonym for Daphniphyllum pentandrum Hayata
- Daphniphyllum gracile K.Rosenth., non D. gracile Gage. (1919), now a synonym of Daphniphyllum timorianum (T.C.Huang) T.C.Huang
- Daphniphyllum latifolium K.Rosenth., now a synonym of Daphniphyllum majus Müll.Arg. var. majus
- Daphniphyllum longeracemosum K.Rosenth.
- Daphniphyllum neilgherrense (Wight) K.Rosenth.
- Daphniphyllum oldhamii K.Rosenth., now a synonym of Daphniphyllum pentandrum Hayata
- Daphniphyllum paxianum K.Rosenth.

== Publications ==
- Monographie der Gattung Daphniphyllum, 1916, Schlesische Friedrich-Wilhelms-Universität zu Breslau, Ph.D. Dissertation, R. Nischkowsky, Breslau

Das Pflanzenreich : regni vegetabilis conspectus / Heft 68, Euphorbiaceae - Additamentum VI: Euphorbiaceae acalypheae plukenetiinae ... Daphniphyllaceae, F. Pax, Käthe Hoffmann and Käthe Rosenthal, 1919, Englemann, Leipzig
