= Daphniphyllum majus =

Scientific classification
- Kingdom: Plantae
- Clade: Embryophytes
- Clade: Tracheophytes
- Clade: Spermatophytes
- Clade: Angiosperms
- Clade: Eudicots
- Order: Saxifragales
- Family: Daphniphyllaceae
- Genus: Daphniphyllum
- Species: D. majus

Binomial name
- Daphniphyllum majus Müll.Arg.

Synonyms
- Daphniphyllum candelabrum Croizat & F.P.Metcalf; D. latifolium K.Rosenth.; D. longipes Craib; D. yunnanense C.C.Huang ex T.L.Ming; Ricinus furfuraceus Wall.; Variety synonyms; D. phanrangense Gagnep. =synonym of D. majus var. phanrangense (Gagnep.) T.C.Huang; D. pierrei Hance =synonym of D. majus var. pierrei (Hance) T.C.Huang

Species of shrub from Southeast Asia and Yunnan

Occurring as a shrub or as a tree, Daphniphyllum majus is a species in the family Daphniphyllaceae. It is found in Mainland Southeast Asia and Yunnan in China. Uses of the plant include fuel and smoking-material.

== Taxonomy ==
The species is in section Lunata of Daphniphyllum, along with D. calycinum and D. griffithianum.

This species has 4 accepted infraspecific varieties:

- Daphniphyllum majus var. deciduum T.C.Huang
- Daphniphyllum majus var. majus
- Daphniphyllum majus var. phanrangense (Gagnep.) T.C.Huang
- Daphniphyllum majus var. pierrei (Hance) T.C.Huang

== Description ==
Daphniphyllum majus grow from 2 to 10 m (6 ft 7 in to 32 ft 10 in) tall. Its grayish-brown branchlets are stout and densely covered in lenticels. The leaf blade is green when dry, glaucous below, oblong-elliptic or obovate-oblong in shape, (16-)20-37 × 7-14 cm, apex acuminate, reticulate veins are prominent on both surfaces. Along with some others species of the genus, D. majus has loosely arranged conical to round palisade cells in its leaves. The species also has small (20 microns) irregular epidermal guard cells on the adaxial ("top") side of the leaf and bigger (24 microns) dome-shaped epidermal/guard cells on the abaxial side along with leaf stomata that are hemiparacytic (traits only shared with D. calycinum). The calyx is persistent, 2–3mm in size. The fruit 10–15 mm, not glaucous, loosely arranged. The plant flowers in China in March and April, fruiting from October to December.

Var. pierrei is a tall shrub, growing 1 to 6 m (3 ft 3 in to 19 ft 8 in) tall.

== Distribution ==
The species overall is native to Thailand, Cambodia, Vietnam, southern Yunnan (where it is found in Jinghong, Maguan, Malipo, Menghai, and Pingbian counties and Simao District), Laos and Myanmar. Var. deciduum is endemic to Cambodia. The nominate variety, var. majus, is found in Thailand, Myanmar and Yunnan. Var. phanrangense is endemic to Vietnam. Thailand, Cambodia, Vietnam and Laos are the native regions for the var. pierrei.

== Habitat ==
In China, D. majus is found in forest at between 1,100 and 1,500 m (3,600 and 4,900 ft) elevation. Var. pierrei is found in coastal forests.

== Vernacular names ==
Daphniphyllum majus is known as 大叶虎皮楠 da ye hu pi nan in China. Var. pierrei is known as rum dé:nh or châmbâk pra:ng in Khmer.

== Uses ==
The dried leaves of var. pierrei are smoked (as in tobacco) in Cambodia. The wood is excellent firewood.
