= Daphniphyllum neilgherrense =

Scientific classification
- Kingdom: Plantae
- Clade: Tracheophytes
- Clade: Angiosperms
- Clade: Eudicots
- Order: Saxifragales
- Family: Daphniphyllaceae
- Genus: Daphniphyllum
- Species: D. neilgherrense

Binomial name
- Daphniphyllum neilgherrense (Wight) K.Rosenth.

Synonyms
- Daphniphyllum glaucescens var. concolor Müll.Arg.; Daphniphyllum glaucescens subsp. neilgherrense (Wight); Goughia neilgherrensis Wight

Species of flowering plant

Daphniphyllum neilgherrense is a shrub or small tree found in the Indo-Malaysian region.
