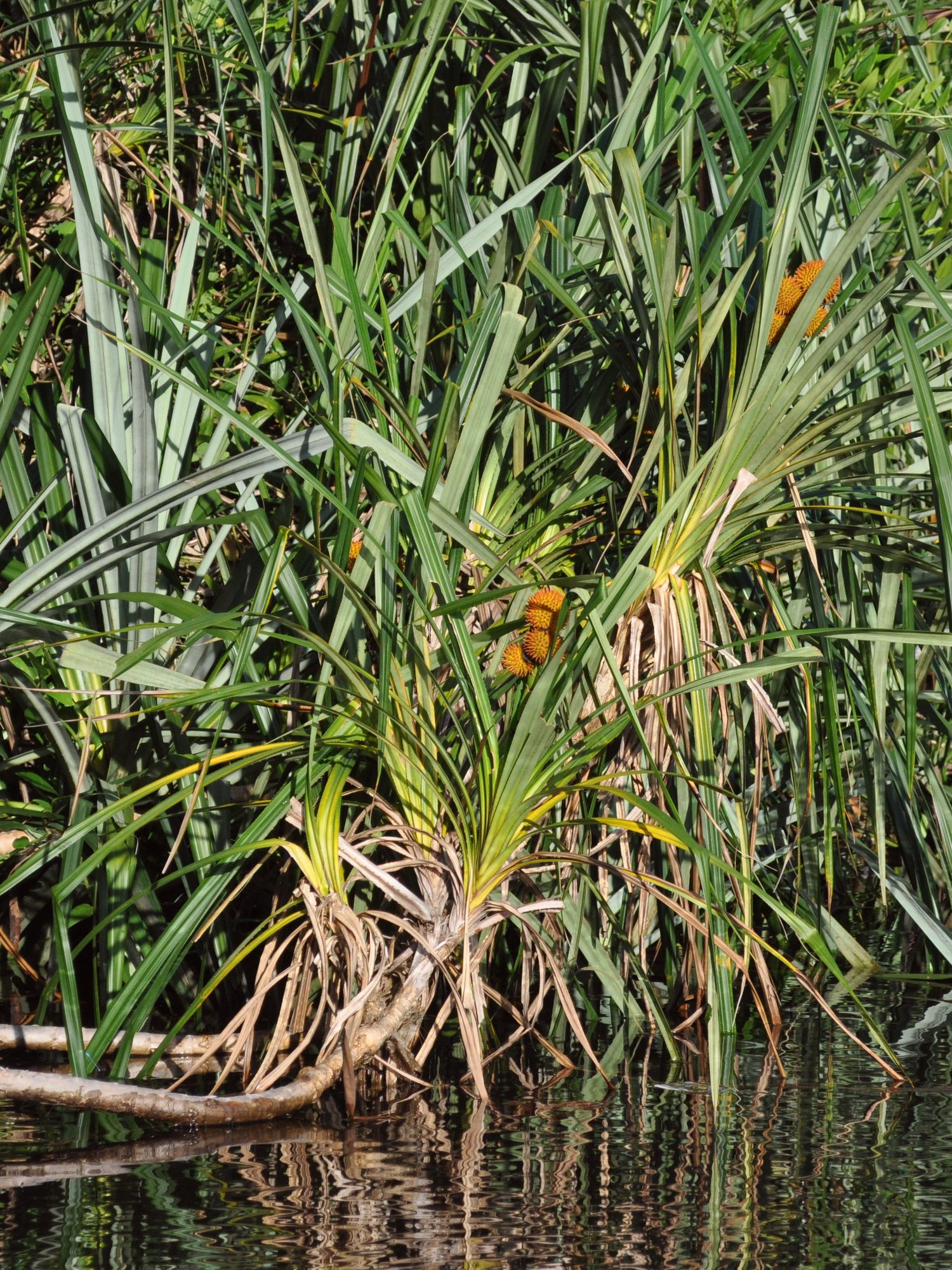
- Benstonea affinis from Sambas Regency, West Kalimantan, Indonesia

Scientific classification
- Kingdom: Plantae
- Clade: Embryophytes
- Clade: Tracheophytes
- Clade: Spermatophytes
- Clade: Angiosperms
- Clade: Monocots
- Order: Pandanales
- Family: Pandanaceae
- Genus: Benstonea; Callm. and Buerki

= Benstonea =

Genus of flowering plants

Benstonea is a genus of flowering plants in the family Pandanaceae, native to the Paleotropics.

== Description ==
Plants in this genus are stemless or short-stemmed shrubs, epiphytes, or (rarely) trees. Leaves are long and strap like, and pleated along the length. Spines may be present along the margins and the pleats. The inflorescences are either terminal or carried on a short side branch. The fruit is a syncarp consisting of numerous simple drupes that never coalesce into phalanges as do those of Pandanus species.

Plants in the genus are characterised by:

- Leaves having spines on the ventral pleats towards the tip of the leaf,
- Monocarpellate drupes with the stigmatic grooves on the adaxial side of the stigma
- Male flowers having one stamen, or free stamens in triads.

== Taxonomy ==
Plants in this genus were formerly placed in Pandanus subgenus Acrostigma, which contained four sections, namely sect. Acrostigma, sect. Epiphytica, sect. Fusiforma and sect. Pseudoacrostigma, largely the work by the British-American botanist Benjamin Clemens Stone. In 2012 Martin W. Callmander and Sven Buerki published a paper which recognised the distinctive traits of the subgenus - based on morphology and DNA sequencing - and transferred most taxa from Pandanus sect. Acrostigma to their newly created genus Benstonea. In the following year, after additional research, they transferred all other members of the subgenus to Benstonea.

=== Etymology ===
The genus name Benstonea was chosen by Callamander in recognition of the decades of research work on this family which was undertaken by Stone through the middle and late 20th century.

== Distribution ==
Benstonea is distributed from India to Fiji with centres of diversity in Borneo, Peninsular Malaysia and New Guinea.

== Species ==
As of July 2026, Plants of the World Online recognises 58 species in this genus, as follows:

- Benstonea adinobotrys (Merr. & L.M.Perry) Callm. & Buerki
- Benstonea affinis (Kurz) Callm. & Buerki
- Benstonea alticola (Holttum & H.St.John) Callm. & Buerki
- Benstonea ashtonii (B.C.Stone) Callm. & Buerki
- Benstonea atrocarpa (Griff.) Callm. & Buerki
- Benstonea beccata (B.C.Stone) Callm. & Buerki
- Benstonea brevistylis (H.St.John ex B.C.Stone) Callm. & Buerki
- Benstonea brunigii (H.St.John ex B.C.Stone) Callm. & Buerki
- Benstonea calcinacta (H.St.John ex B.C.Stone) Callm. & Buerki
- Benstonea celebica (Warb.) Callm. & Buerki
- Benstonea copelandii (Merr.) Callm. & Buerki
- Benstonea dumetorum (Holttum & H.St.John) Callm. & Buerki
- Benstonea ellipsoidea (Warb.) Callm. & Buerki
- Benstonea elostigma (Martelli) Callm. & Buerki
- Benstonea epiphytica (Martelli) Callm. & Buerki
- Benstonea eumekes (H.St.John ex B.C.Stone) Callm. & Buerki
- Benstonea foetida (Roxb.) Callm. & Buerki
- Benstonea fortuita Callm. & Buerki
- Benstonea gibbsiana (Martelli) Callm. & Buerki
- Benstonea glaucophylla (Ridl.) Callm. & Buerki
- Benstonea herbacea (Martelli) Callm. & Buerki
- Benstonea humilis (Lour.) Callm. & Buerki
- Benstonea ihuana (Martelli) Callm. & Buerki
- Benstonea inquilina (B.C.Stone) Callm. & Buerki
- Benstonea korthalsii (Solms) Callm. & Buerki
- Benstonea kurzii (Merr.) Callm. & Buerki
- Benstonea lauterbachii (K.Schum. & Warb.) Callm. & Buerki
- Benstonea lepatophila (B.C.Stone) Callm. & Buerki
- Benstonea microglottis (B.C.Stone) Callm. & Buerki
- Benstonea monticola (F.Muell.) Callm. & Buerki
- Benstonea nana (Martelli) Callm. & Buerki
- Benstonea ornata (Kurz) Callm. & Buerki
- Benstonea ornithocephala (H.St.John ex B.C.Stone) Callm. & Buerki
- Benstonea pachyphylla (Merr.) Callm. & Buerki
- Benstonea papuana Callm. & Buerki
- Benstonea parva (Ridl.) Callm. & Buerki
- Benstonea pectinata (Martelli) Callm. & Buerki
- Benstonea permicron (Kaneh.) Callm. & Buerki
- Benstonea pilaris (Ridl.) Callm. & Buerki
- Benstonea platystigma (Martelli) Callm. & Buerki
- Benstonea poronaliva (B.C.Stone) Callm. & Buerki
- Benstonea pseudosyncarpa (Kaneh.) Callm. & Buerki
- Benstonea pumila (H.St.John) Callm. & Buerki
- Benstonea rostellata (Merr. & L.M.Perry) Callm. & Buerki
- Benstonea rupestris (B.C.Stone) Callm. & Buerki
- Benstonea rustica (B.C.Stone) Callm. & Buerki
- Benstonea saint-johnii (B.C.Stone) Callm. & Buerki
- Benstonea serpentinica Callm. & Buerki
- Benstonea setistyla (Warb.) Callm. & Buerki
- Benstonea stenocarpa (Solms) Callm. & Buerki
- Benstonea sylvatica (B.C.Stone) Callm. & Buerki
- Benstonea thomissophylla (B.C.Stone) Callm. & Buerki
- Benstonea thurstonii (C.H.Wright) Callm. & Buerki
- Benstonea thwaitesii (Martelli) Callm. & Buerki
- Benstonea tunicata (B.C.Stone) Callm. & Buerki
- Benstonea undulifolia (Holttum & H.St.John) Callm. & Buerki
- Benstonea verruculosa (Backer ex B.C.Stone) Callm., Buerki & A.P.Keim
- Benstonea vriensii (Martelli) Callm. & Buerki

== Gallery ==
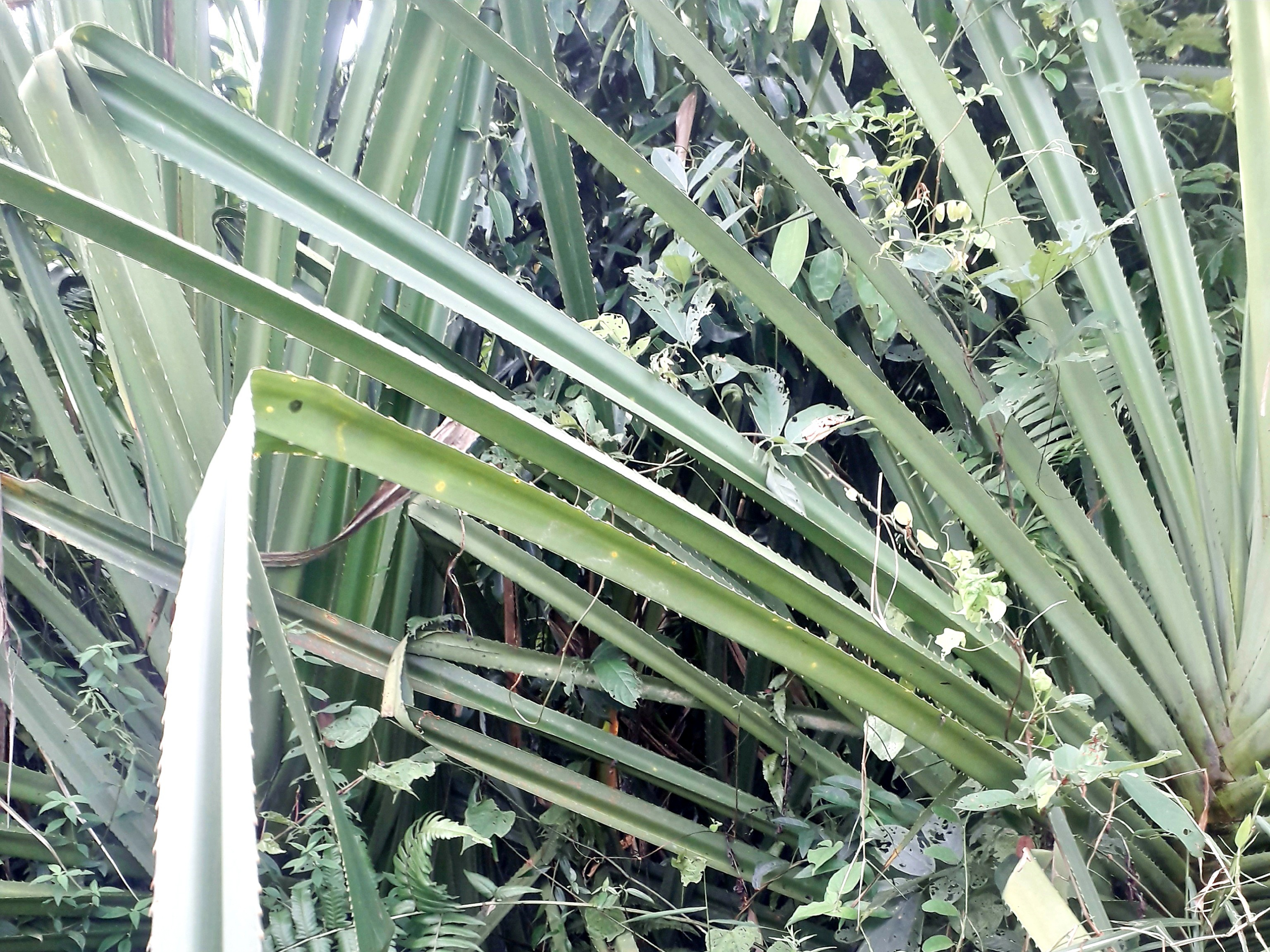
Benstonea atrocarpus

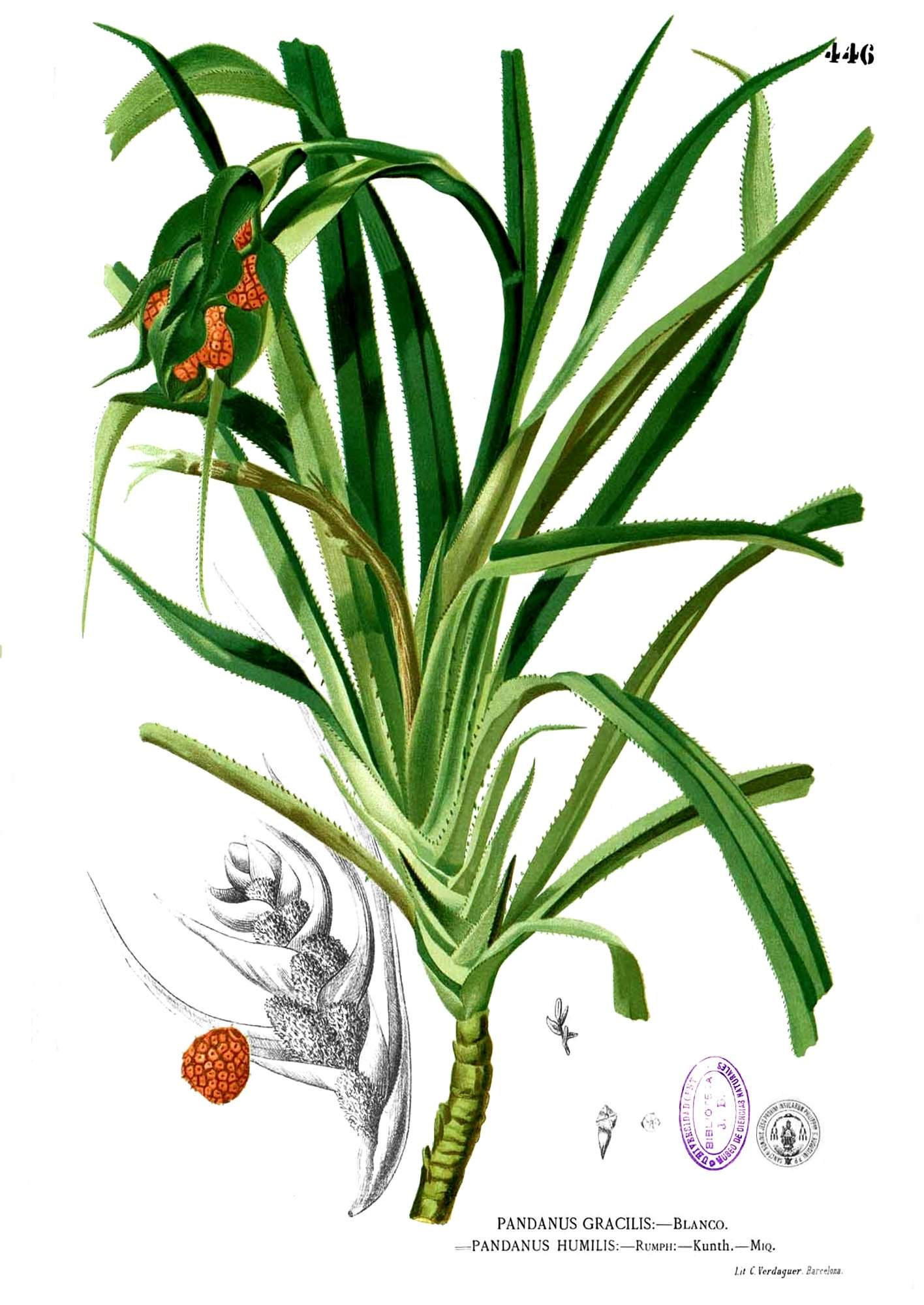
Benstonea humilis

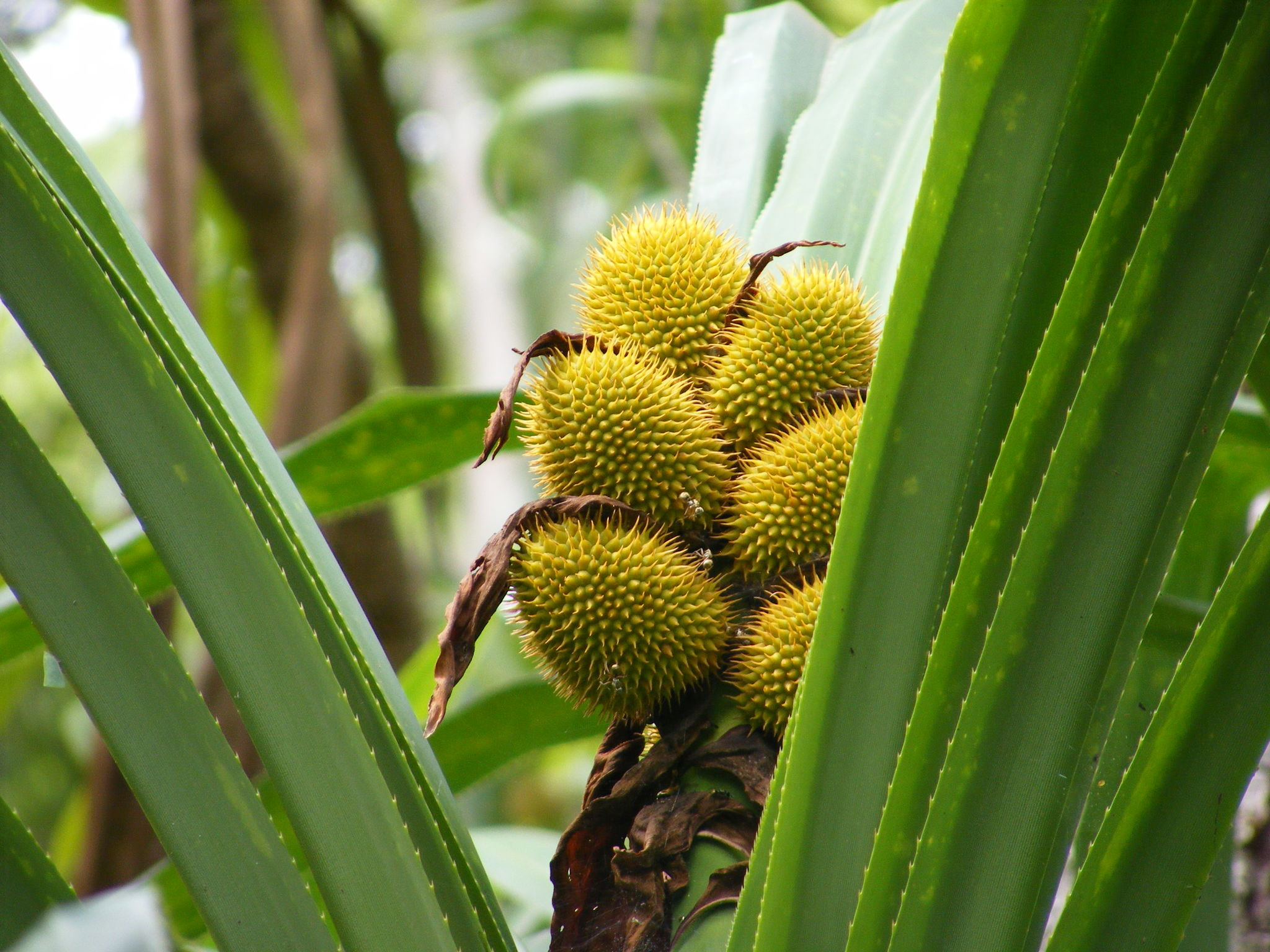
Benstonea lauterbachii

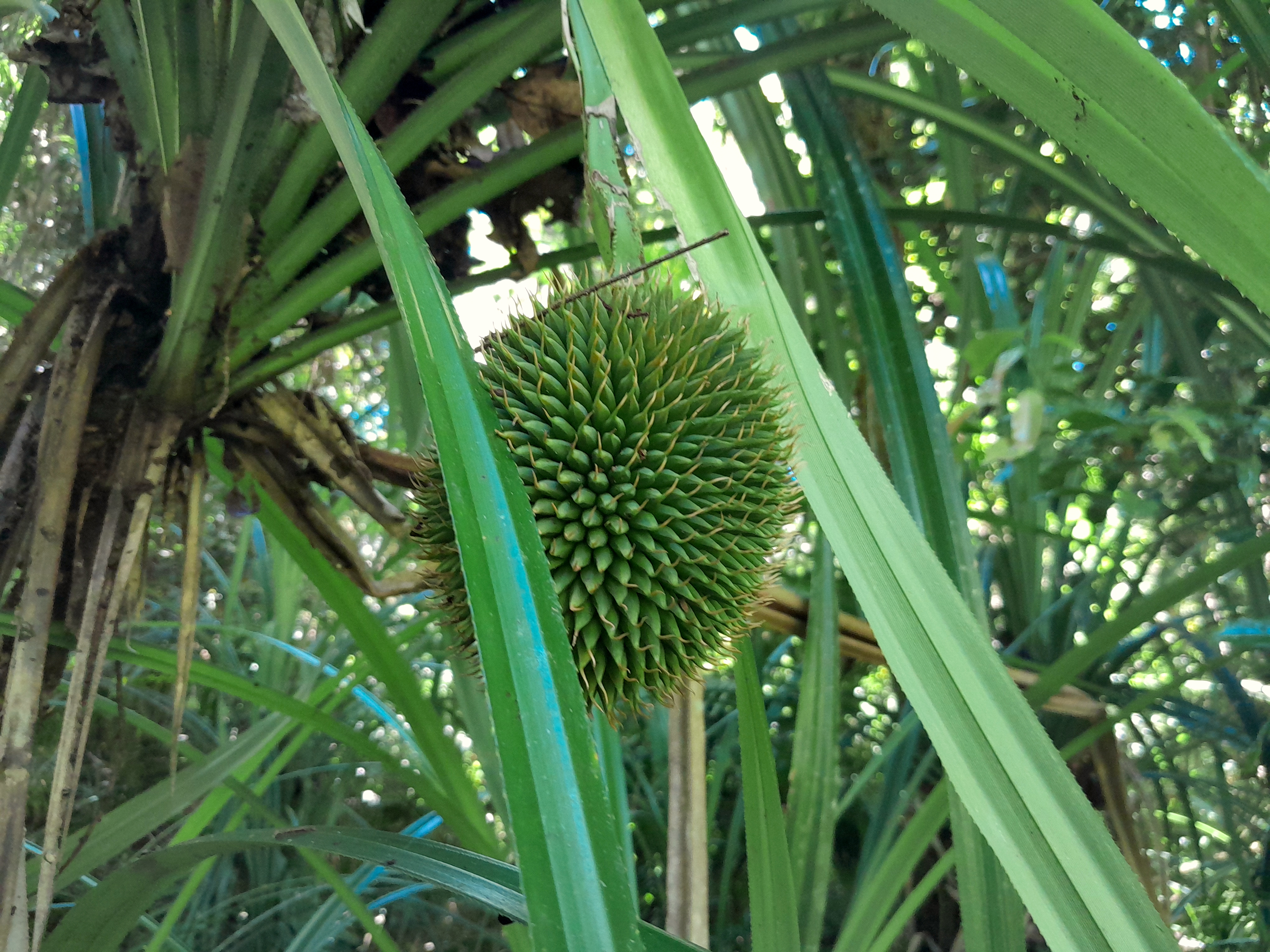
Benstonea monticola

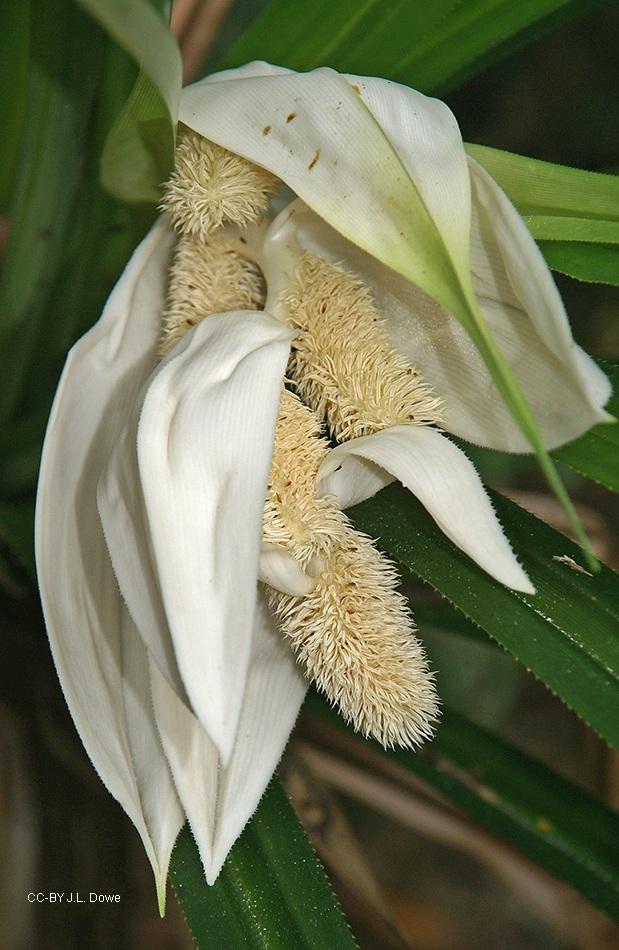
Flowers of B. monticola
