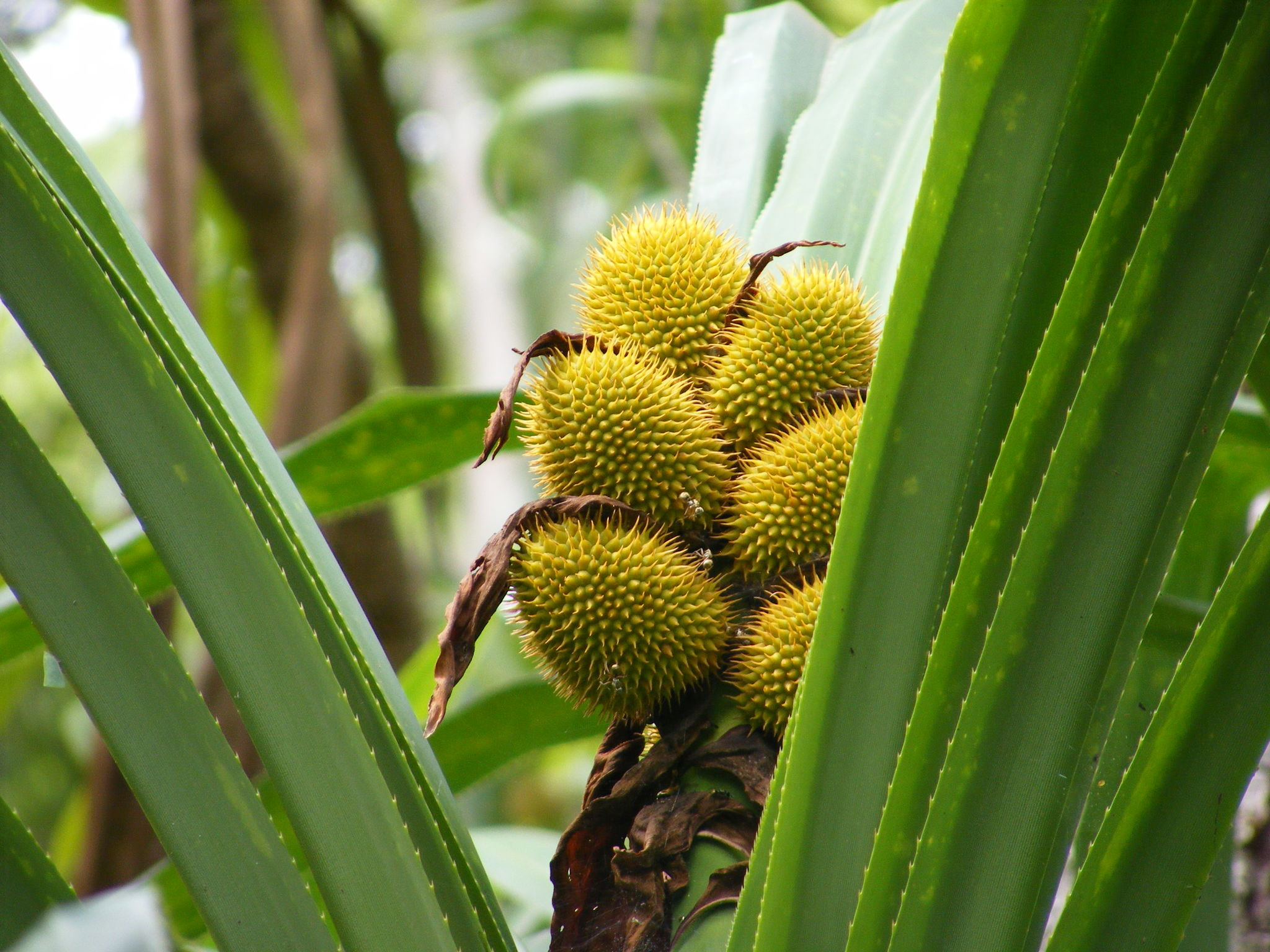
- Immature fruit

Conservation status
- Least Concern (NCA)
- Least Concern (IUCN 3.1)

Scientific classification
- Kingdom: Plantae
- Clade: Embryophytes
- Clade: Tracheophytes
- Clade: Angiosperms
- Clade: Monocots
- Order: Pandanales
- Family: Pandanaceae
- Genus: Benstonea
- Species: B. lauterbachii

Binomial name
- Benstonea lauterbachii (K.Schum. & Warb.) Callm. & Buerki

Synonyms
- Pandanus lauterbachii K.Schum. & Warb.; Benstonea odoardi (Martelli) Callm. & Buerki; Pandanus humicola Kaneh.; Pandanus odoardi Martelli; Pandanus pentagonos H.St.John

= Benstonea lauterbachii =

Lauterbach's pandan

Species of flowering plant

Benstonea lauterbachii, commonly known as Lauterbach's pandan, is a species of plant in the family Pandanaceae endemic to Cape York Peninsula in Queensland, Australia. It is a shrub or small tree to 15 m (49 ft), first described (as Pandanus lauterbachii) in 1900 by Adolf Engler. In 2012, Martin Callmander and Sven Buerki transferred it to the newly created genus Benstonea. In Australia it is found from the top of Cape York to Iron Range, with an isolated occurrence at the Hull River near Tully.

== Gallery ==
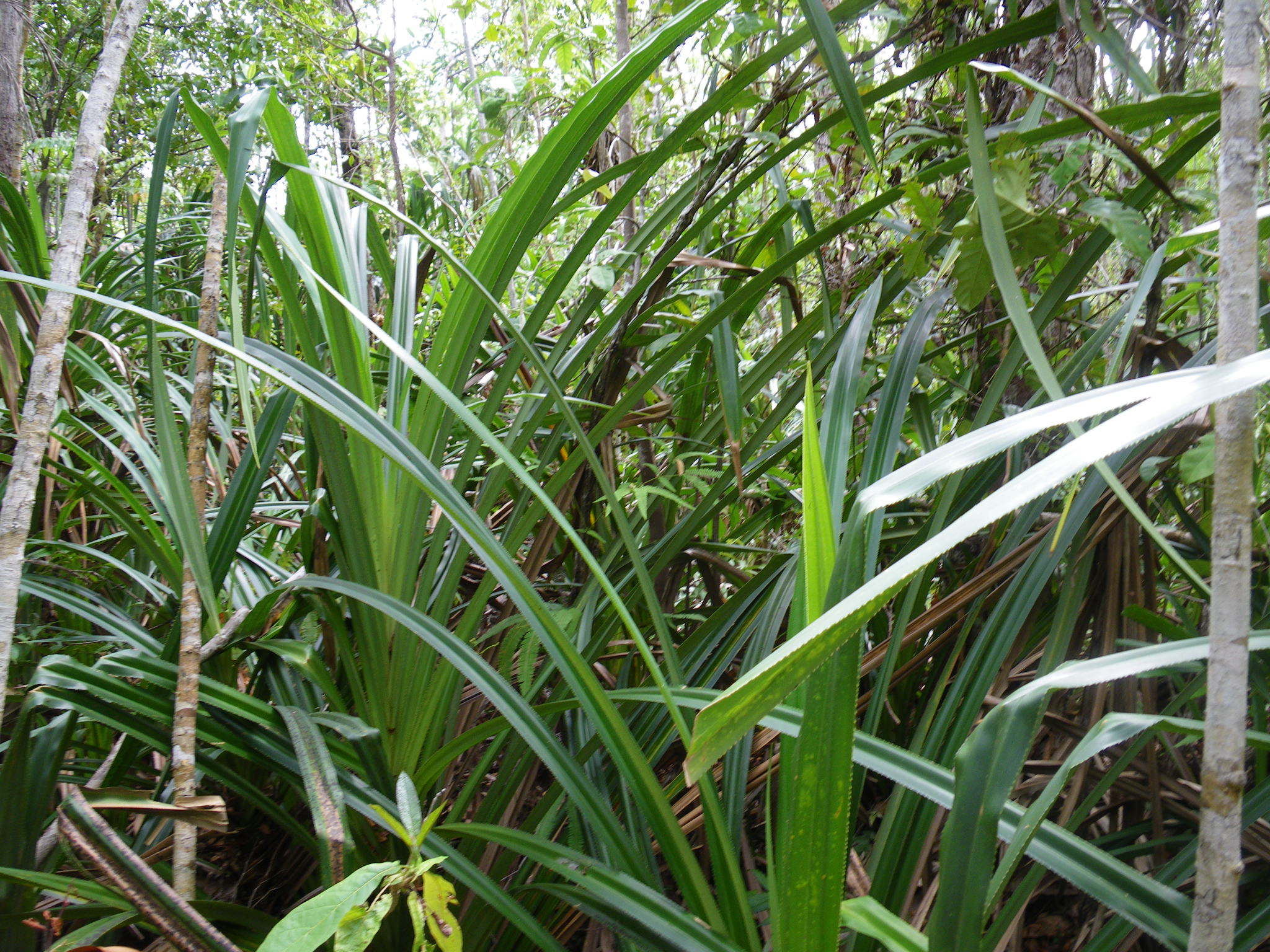
Foliage

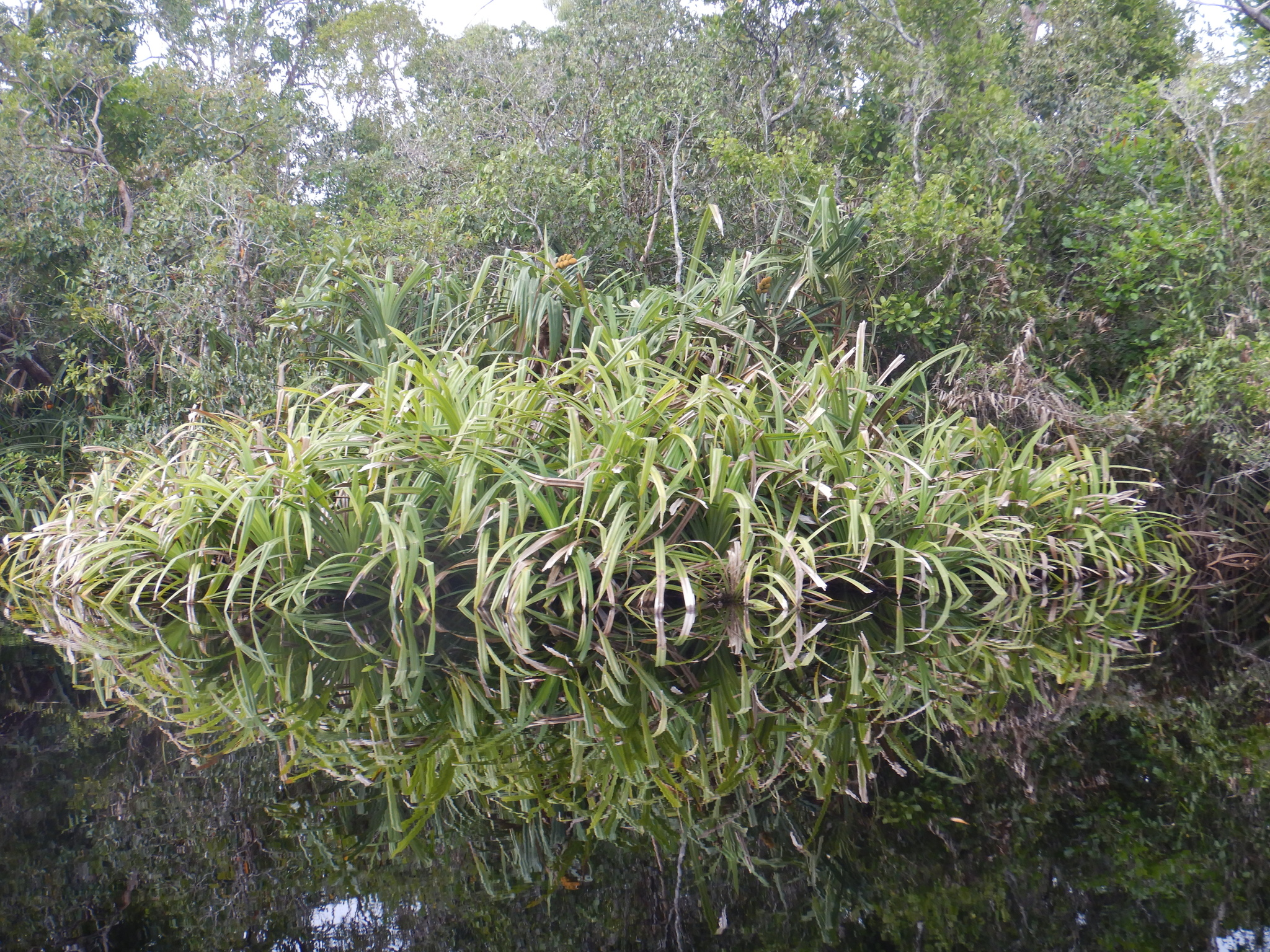
Growing in a swamp

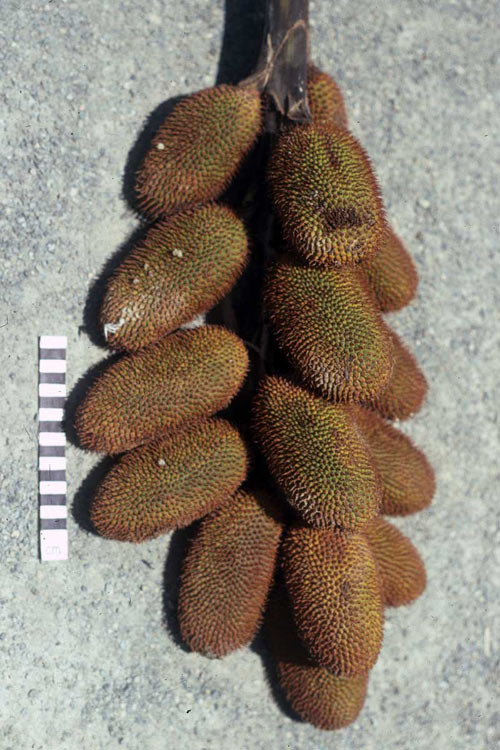
Infructescence
