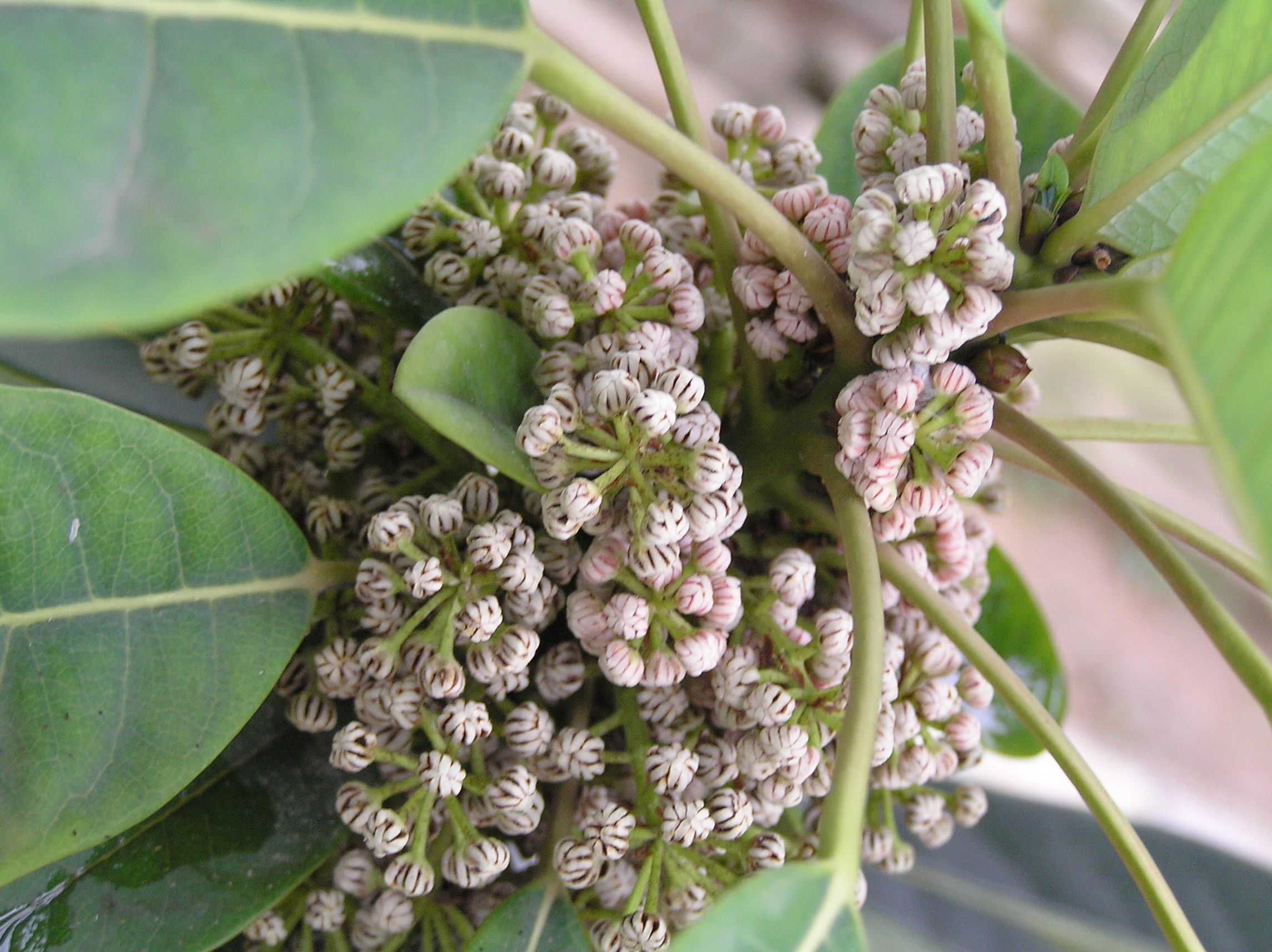

Conservation status
- Least Concern (IUCN 3.1)

Scientific classification
- Kingdom: Plantae
- Clade: Embryophytes
- Clade: Tracheophytes
- Clade: Angiosperms
- Clade: Eudicots
- Order: Saxifragales
- Family: Daphniphyllaceae
- Genus: Daphniphyllum
- Species: D. calycinum

Binomial name
- Daphniphyllum calycinum Benth.

Synonyms
- Daphniphyllum calleryanum Baill.; Daphniphyllum gaudichaudianum Baill.

= Daphniphyllum calycinum =

Species of shrub from Vietnam and China

Daphniphyllum calycinum is a species of shrubby plant in the family Daphniphyllaceae. It is found in northern Vietnam and southeastern China. It is used in biodiesel and in lubrication, soap-making and Chinese medicine.

== Taxonomy ==
The species is in section Lunata of Daphniphyllum, along with D. griffithianum and D. majus.

"[T]he premier systematic botanist of the nineteenth century", George Bentham (1800–84), English, described this plant in 1861 in his publication Flora Hongkongensis; a description of the flowering plants and ferns of the island of Hongkong

== Description ==
This species grows as a shrub some 1-5-4m tall. The grayish-brown branches are sparsely lenticillate. The petioles are some 4 to 8 cm long. The obovate to obovate-elliptic leaf blades are 12–16 by 4–9 cm in size, they are chartaceous, glaucous/hairy and are inconspicuously papillate on lower surface; broadly cuneate leaf base, slightly reflexed margins and obtuse to rounded apex, mucronate; 8-11 pairs of later veins are visible on upper surface, prominent on lower. Male flowers have an 8–10 cm pedicel and a discoid calyx with 3 or 4 broadly triangular lobes, 9 or 10 stamens some 3 mm long with very short filaments, oblong laterally-compressed anthers, connective exserted. Female flowers have a 5–6 mm pedicel, broadly-triangular calyx-loves about 1.5mm in size, ellipsoidal ovary 1.5–2 mm in size, very short style, 2 recurved stigmas. The Infructescence/fruiting head is some 4–5 cm in size, densely arranged with ovoid-ellipsoidal, tubercalate, glaucous drupes some 7 by 4 mm in size, with persistent calyx and style branches. Flowering occurs from April to June, while fruiting is from August to November.

Distinguishing characteristics of this species are: the size (9–16 by 4–9 cm) and shape (obovate to obovate-elliptic) of the leaf blade, the obtuse to rounded apex; and size (about 7 mm), dense arrangement and glaucousness of the fruit.

== Distribution ==
The plant is native to an area from northern Vietnam to southeastern China (Fujian, Guangdong, Guangxi, Hong Kong, south Hunan, south Jiangxi).

== Habitat and ecology ==
The shrub grows in forests and thickets at altitudes of occasionally below 100 m (330 ft) but mainly 200–700 m (660–2,300 ft).

Daphniphyllum calycinum is present on the degraded hillside shrublands of Hong Kong, it is common there in scrubland and forest edges. Birds disperse the dry-season fruiting seeds.

The follicular micromycete, or sac-fungi, Mycosphaerella fasciculata, in the Mycosphaerellaceae family, uses this species as a host.

== Conservation ==
The species is listed as "least concern".

== Vernacular names ==
- vai lá xoan ngược is a name used in Vietnam.
- 牛耳枫, niu er feng, or niu-er-fon, is a name used in China

== Uses ==
The seeds provide abundant oil that was used in lubrication and to make refined soap, however recently because of its toxicity it is only used in biodiesel. Roots and leaves are used within Chinese medicine. The plant has many alkaloids and other active ingredients, see for example Wu et al., 2013.
