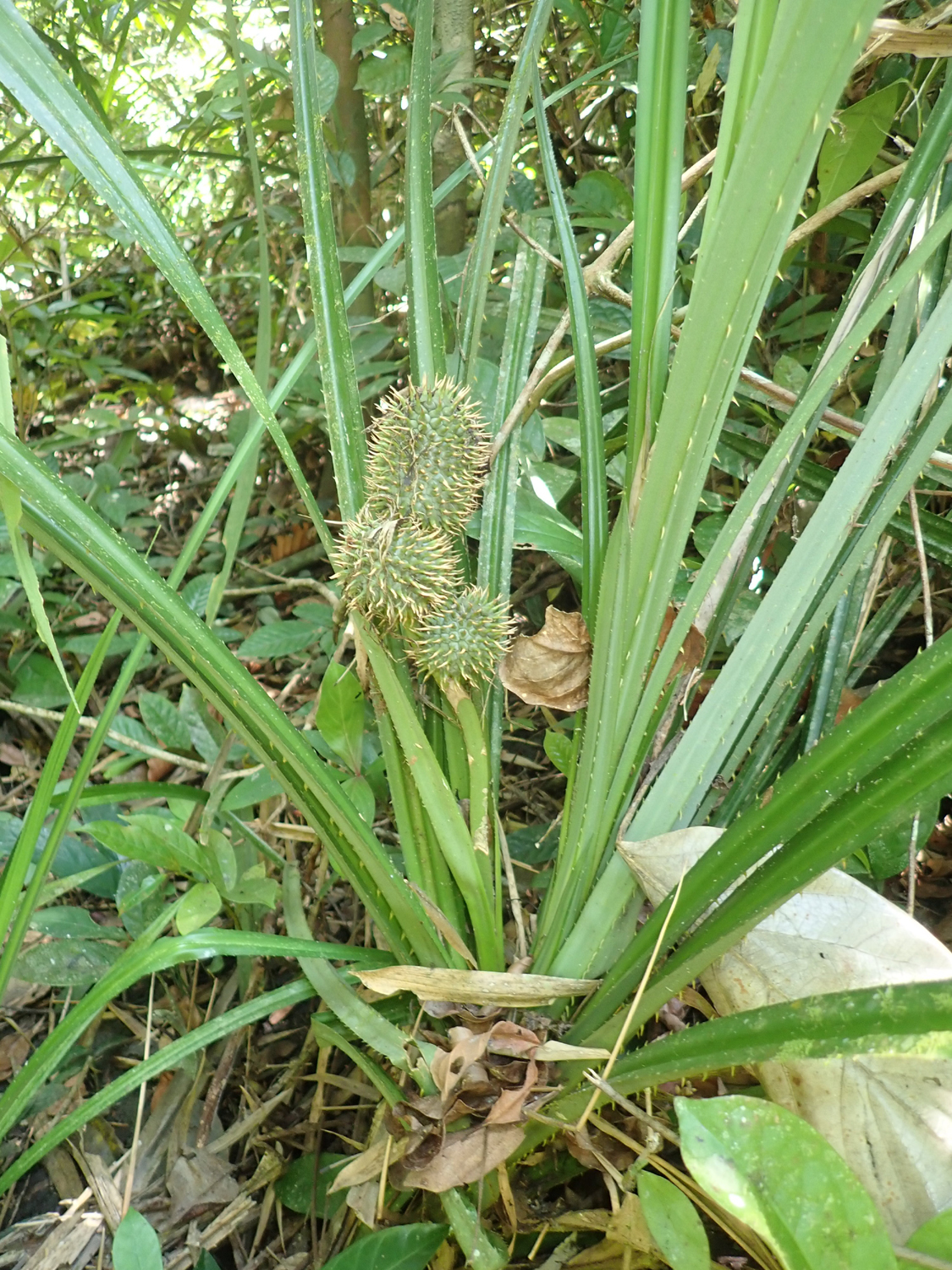

Scientific classification
- Kingdom: Plantae
- Clade: Tracheophytes
- Clade: Angiosperms
- Clade: Monocots
- Order: Pandanales
- Family: Pandanaceae
- Genus: Benstonea
- Species: B. humilis

Binomial name
- Benstonea humilis (Lour.) Callm. & Buerki

Synonyms
- Homotypic Synonyms: Pandanus humilis Lour.; Vinsonia humilis (Lour.) Gaudich.; Heterotypic Synonyms: Benstonea biplicata (H.St.John) Callm. & Buerki; Benstonea toei (H.St.John) Callm. & Buerki; Fisquetia ovata Gaudich.; Pandanus biplicatus H.St.John; Pandanus distans Craib; Pandanus leucocephalus Gagnep.; Pandanus ovatus Warb.; Pandanus perakensis Ridl.; Pandanus pierrei Martelli; Pandanus pierrei var. bariensis Martelli; Pandanus pseudofoetidus Martelli; Pandanus retroaculeatus H.St.John; Pandanus similis Craib; Pandanus toei H.St.John

= Benstonea humilis =

Species of flowering plant

Benstonea humilis (previously placed in the genus Pandanus) is a species of flowering plant in the family Pandanaceae, with no subspecies listed. It is native to Bangladesh, Cambodia, Laos, Malaysia, Myanmar, Thailand, and Vietnam. In Vietnam, it is called dưa nhỏ (literally small "[forest] pineapple").

== Gallery ==
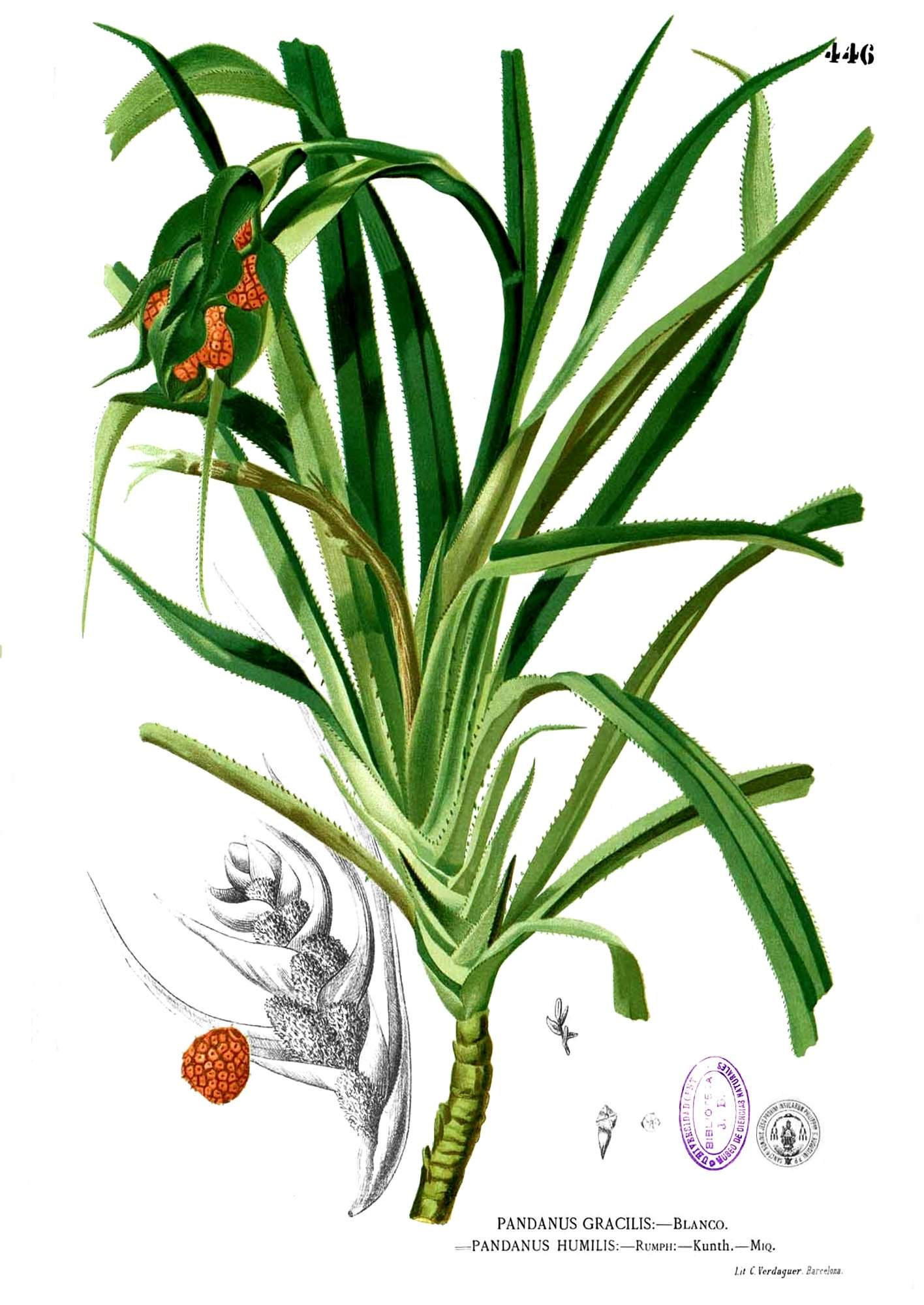
