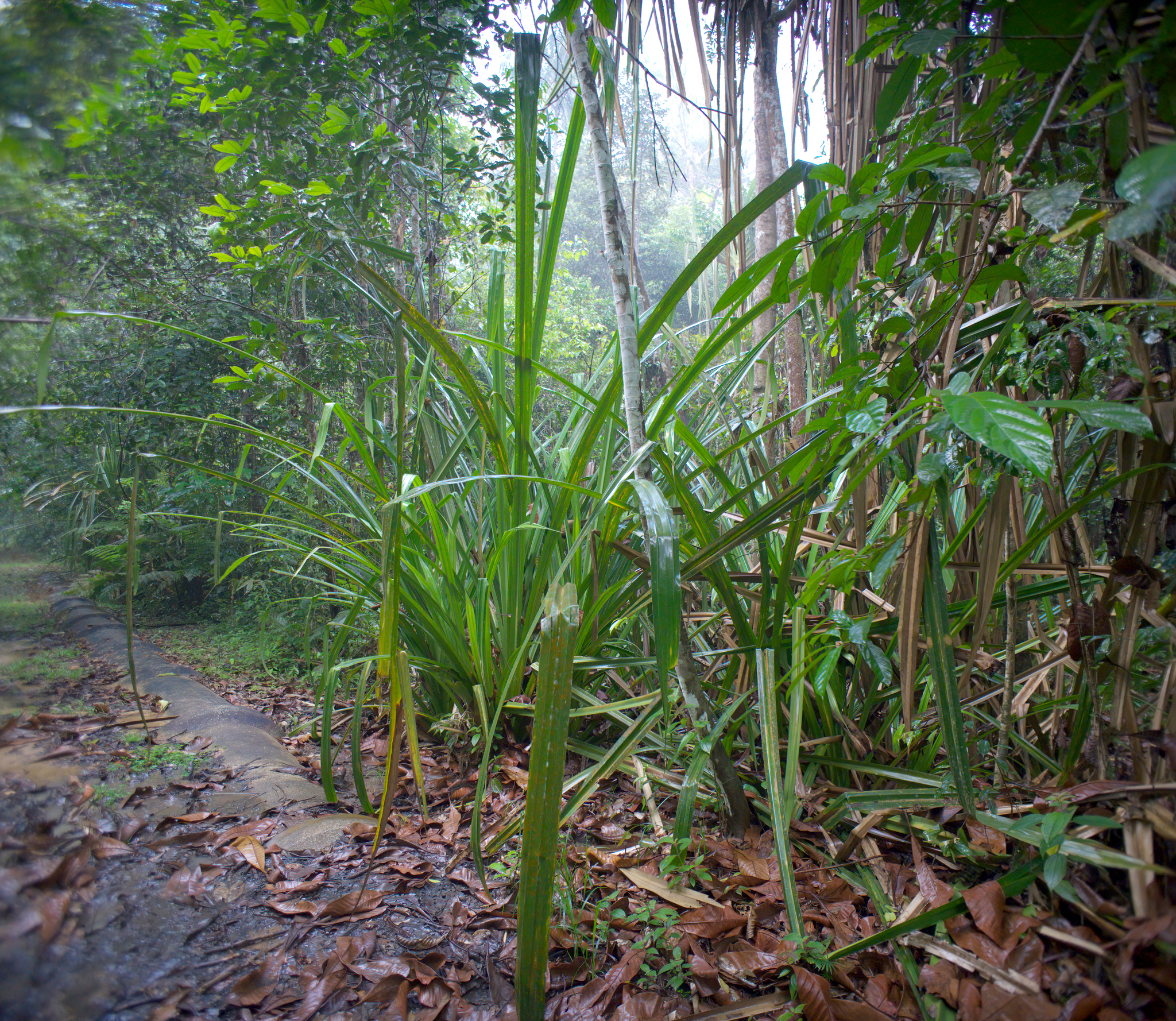
- In Singapore

Scientific classification
- Kingdom: Plantae
- Clade: Embryophytes
- Clade: Tracheophytes
- Clade: Spermatophytes
- Clade: Angiosperms
- Clade: Monocots
- Order: Pandanales
- Family: Pandanaceae
- Genus: Benstonea
- Species: B. atrocarpa

Binomial name
- Benstonea atrocarpa (Griff.) Callm. & Buerki

Synonyms
- Pandanus atrocarpus Griff.

= Benstonea atrocarpa =

Species of flowering plant

Benstonea atrocarpa is a species of plant in the family Pandanaceae, native to the swamp and peat forests of Thailand, Peninsular Malaysia, Singapore and Sumatra.

== Taxonomy ==
This species was first described as Pandanus atrocarpus by British botanist William Griffith in 1851, and transferred to the newly-created genus Benstonea by Swiss botanists Martin Wilhelm Callmander and Sven Buerki in 2012.

=== Etymology ===
The generic name Benstonea is after the Pandanus botanist Benjamin Clemens Stone. The specific name comes from the Greek atro (= dark) and carpa (= fruit).
