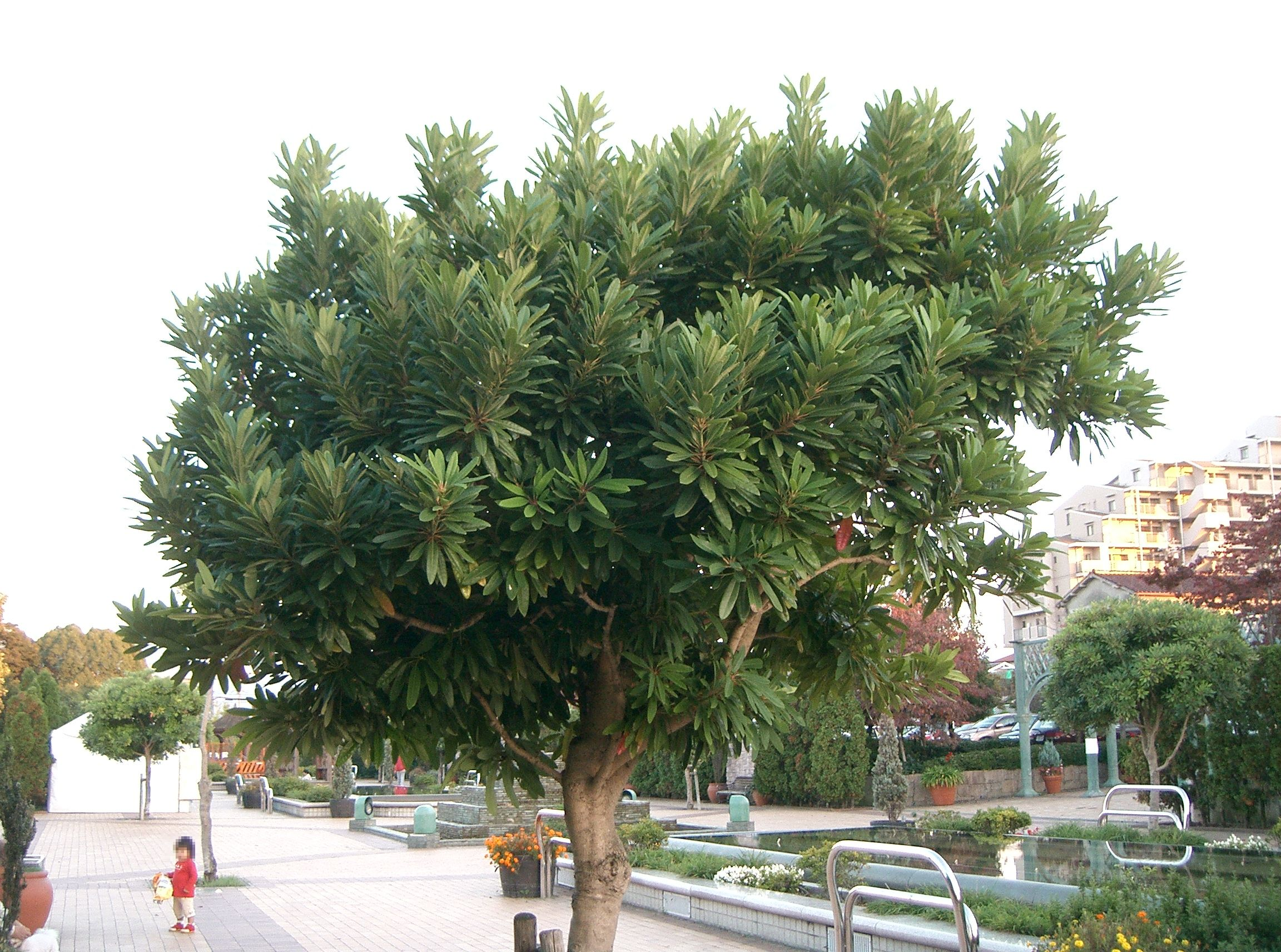
- Daphniphyllum teijsmannii

Scientific classification
- Kingdom: Plantae
- Clade: Tracheophytes
- Clade: Angiosperms
- Clade: Eudicots
- Order: Saxifragales
- Family: Daphniphyllaceae; Müll.Arg.
- Genus: Daphniphyllum; Blume

Type species
- Daphniphyllum glaucescens Blume

Synonyms
- Goughia Wight; Gyrandra Wall., not validly published

= Daphniphyllum =

Genus of flowering plants

Daphniphyllum is the sole genus in the flowering plant family Daphniphyllaceae and was described as a genus in 1826. The genus includes evergreen shrubs and trees mainly native to east and southeast Asia, but also found in the Indian subcontinent and New Guinea.

All species in the family are dioecious, that is male and female flowers are borne on different plants. In older classifications the genus was treated in the family Euphorbiaceae.

Daphniphyllum species are eaten by the larvae of some Lepidoptera species including the engrailed (Ectropis sp.).

== Species ==
As of January 2026, Plants of the World Online accepted the following species:

- Daphniphyllum angustifolium Hutch.
- Daphniphyllum beddomei Craib
- Daphniphyllum borneense Stapf
- Daphniphyllum buchananiifolium Hallier f.
- Daphniphyllum calycinum Benth.
- Daphniphyllum celebense K.Rosenthal
- Daphniphyllum ceramense (T.C.Huang) T.C.Huang
- Daphniphyllum chartaceum K.Rosenthal
- Daphniphyllum dichotomum (T.C.Huang) T.C.Huang
- Daphniphyllum glaucescens Blume
- Daphniphyllum gracile Gage
- Daphniphyllum griffithianum (Wight) Noltie
- Daphniphyllum himalense (Benth.) Müll.Arg.
- Daphniphyllum hongiaoense Yahara & Tagane
- Daphniphyllum × lanyuense (T.C.Huang) M.S.Tang, S.H.Liu & Yuen P.Yang
- Daphniphyllum longeracemosum K.Rosenthal
- Daphniphyllum luzonense Elmer
- Daphniphyllum macropodum Miq.
- Daphniphyllum majus Müll.Arg.
- Daphniphyllum neilgherrense (Wight) K.Rosenthal
- Daphniphyllum papuanum Hallier f.
- Daphniphyllum parvifolium Quisumb. & Merr.
- Daphniphyllum paxianum K.Rosenthal
- Daphniphyllum peltatum Yan Liu & Tao Meng
- Daphniphyllum pentandrum Hayata
- Daphniphyllum scortechinii Hook.f.
- Daphniphyllum subverticillatum Merr.
- Daphniphyllum sumatraense (T.C.Huang) T.C.Huang
- Daphniphyllum teysmannii Kurz ex Teijsm. & Binn.
- Daphniphyllum timorianum (T.C.Huang) T.C.Huang
- Daphniphyllum woodsonianum T.C.Huang

== Bibliography ==
- Ohwi, J. Flora of Japan, 1984. ISBN 978-0-87474-708-9
- Woody Plants of Japan, Vol. 2, 2000. ISBN 4-635-07004-2
- Media related to Daphniphyllum at Wikimedia Commons
- Data related to Daphniphyllum at Wikispecies
