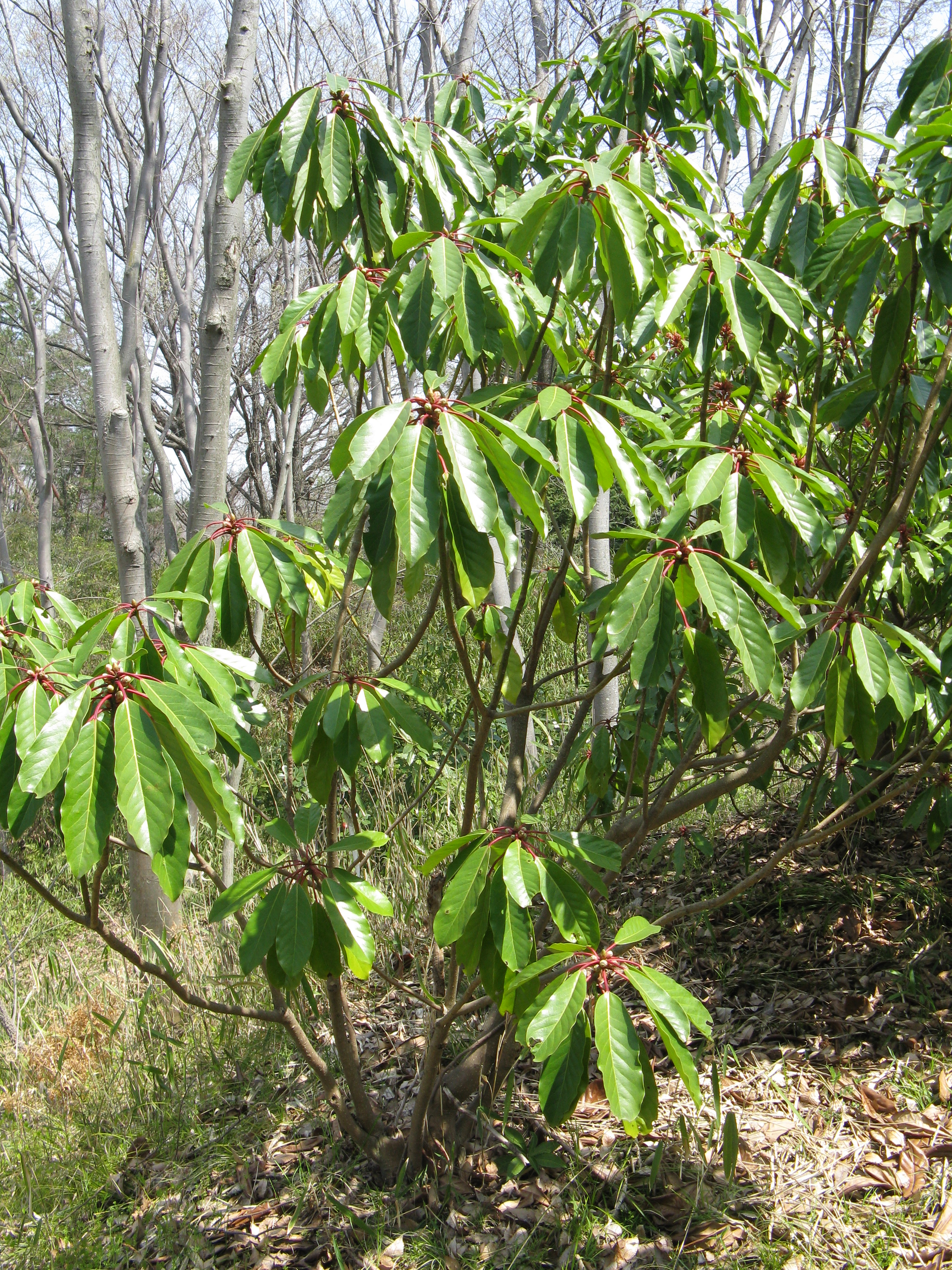
- In habitat in Japan

Scientific classification
- Kingdom: Plantae
- Clade: Tracheophytes
- Clade: Angiosperms
- Clade: Eudicots
- Order: Saxifragales
- Family: Daphniphyllaceae
- Genus: Daphniphyllum
- Species: D. macropodum

Binomial name
- Daphniphyllum macropodum Miq.

Synonyms
- Daphniphyllum humile Maxim. ex Franch. & Sav.

= Daphniphyllum macropodum =

Species of tree

Daphniphyllum macropodum is a shrub or small tree found in China, Japan and Korea. Small populations are also located in the southern Kuril Islands. Like all species in the genus Daphniphyllum, D. macropodum is dioecious, that is male and female flowers are borne on different plants. The timber is used in China in construction and furniture making. It is grown as an ornamental plant, chiefly for its foliage.

== Description ==
Daphniphyllum macropodum is a small tree or shrub, usually 3–10 m (10–33 ft) tall, but occasionally up to 20 m (66 ft) tall. It has long leaves, 14–25 cm (6–10 in) long by 3–6.5 cm (1–3 in) wide, with purplish red stalks (petioles) and conspicuous veins. The leaves are arranged in a tight spiral, almost like whorls at the branch tips. Very young branches are red, turning brown with age; older trunks are greyish brown.

The clusters of flowers (inflorescences) emerge from leaf axils on the previous year's growth. Each cluster has a pink bract at its base which initially encloses it; they have been described as being like "miniature tissue-wrapped bunches of grapes". The tiny flowers, which have a disagreeable smell, lack sepals or petals. Each plant is either male or female (i.e. has flowers with either functional stamens or functional ovaries). Male flowers have 6–12 pink stamens, about 3 mm (0.1 in) long. Female flowers have a single green ovary, 2–3 mm (0.1 in) long; they sometimes also have staminodes – nonfunctional stamens. When female flowers are fertilized, purplish brown fruits (drupes) develop, about 1 cm (0.4 in) long.

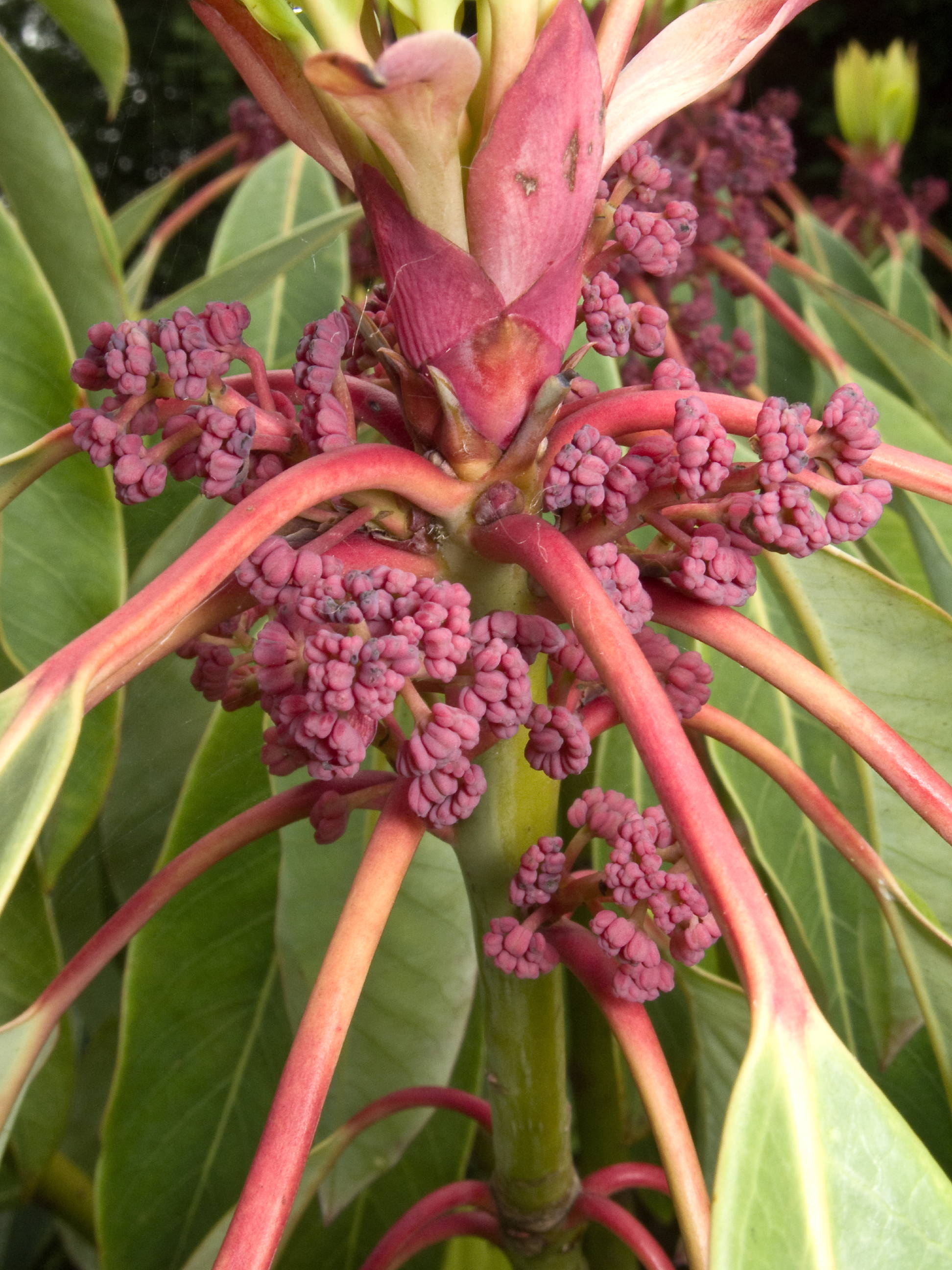
Male flowers - in cultivation at the Birmingham Botanical Gardens (United Kingdom)

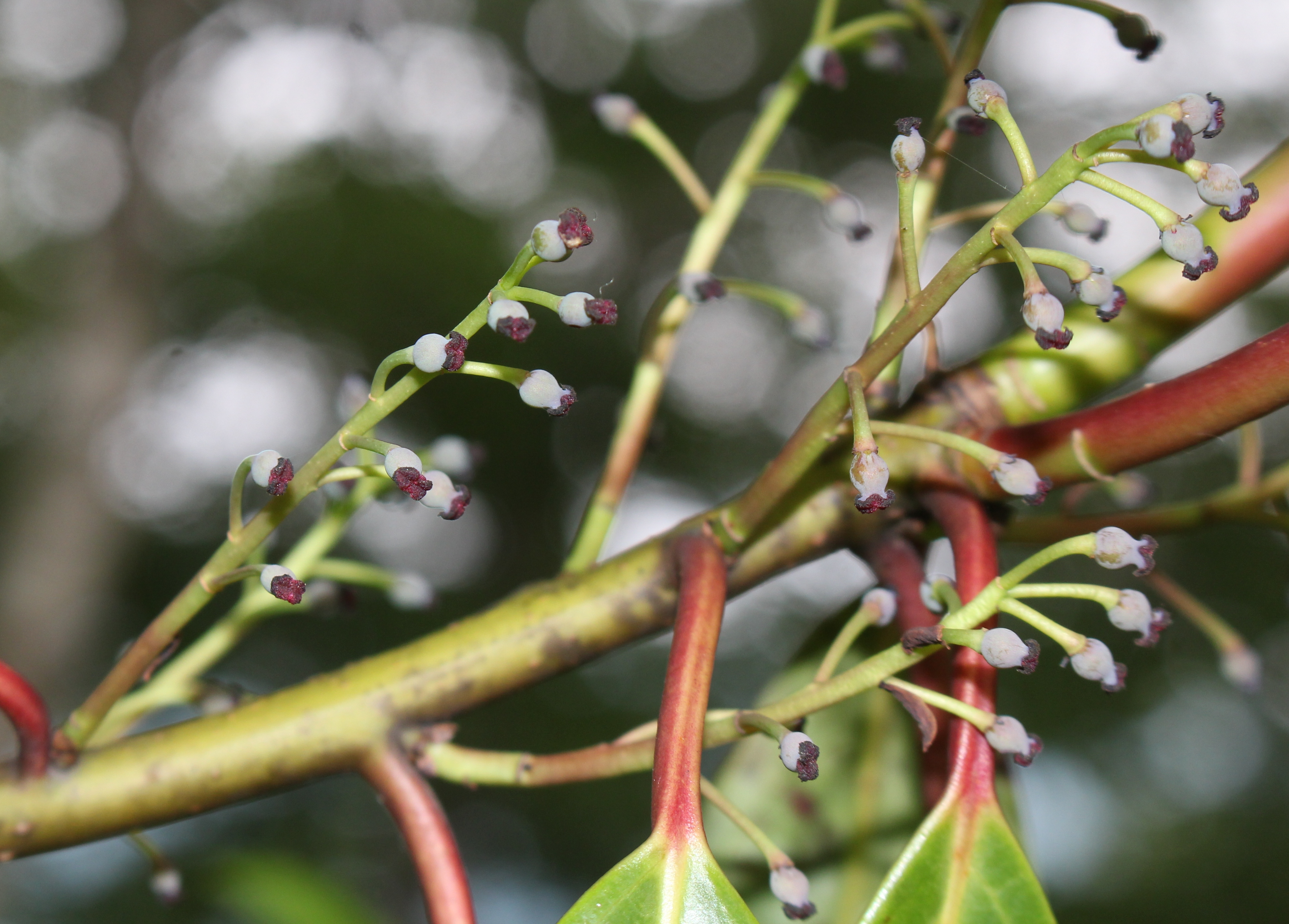
Female flowers in Japan

== Taxonomy ==
Daphniphyllum macropodum was first described by Friedrich Miquel in 1867. In 1966, Tseng Chieng Huang reduced it to D. himalayense subsp. macropodum. Other sources, such as the Flora of China and the World Checklist of Selected Plant Families (WCSP), do not accept this placement. Further synonyms include D. humile Maxim. ex Franch. & Sav., which has also been treated as D. macropodum subsp. (or var.) humile, names not accepted by the WCSP.

== Fossil record ==
Among the middle Miocene Sarmatian palynoflora from the Lavanttal Basin Austria, researchers have firmly recognized Daphniphyllum fossil pollen. The sediment containing the Daphniphyllum fossil pollen had accumulated in a lowland wetland environment with various vegetation units of mixed evergreen/deciduous broadleaved/conifer forests surrounding the wetland basin. Key relatives of the fossil taxa found with Daphniphyllum are presently confined to humid warm temperate environments, suggesting a subtropical climate during the middle Miocene in Austria.

== Cultivation ==
D. macropodum, like other species in the genus, can be grown as an ornamental evergreen shrub or small tree, when its main attractions are its large leaves and pink-flushed new growth. A sheltered situation in moist but well-drained soil is recommended. The newly emerged shoots are easily damaged by frost. Although growing to become a small tree in its natural habitat, in gardens it is more often found as a well-branched shrub. Propagation is by heel cuttings or fresh seed.

== Protection ==
In South Korea, on Naejangsan, at the northernmost limit of their distribution in South Korea, a grove of these gulgeori trees (굴거리나무) is protected.

== Uses ==
The leaves are dried and smoked by the Ainu in Japan and Siberia.

In China, a decoction of the fresh leaves, combined with either straw ash and water or fresh pumpkin leaves, is strained to create grass jelly.

In Korea the leaves and bark are sold to people suffering from acute pleurisy, peritonitis, and diuresis, and the water in which the leaves are boiled is also used as an antihelminthic in folk medicine.

== Bibliography ==
- Christenhusz, Maarten J. M.; Fay, Michael F.; Chase, Mark W. (2017). "Daphniphyllaceae". Plants of the World: An Illustrated Encyclopedia of Vascular Plants. University of Chicago Press. p. 236. ISBN 978-0-226-52292-0.
- "Daphniphyllum humile Maxim. ex Franch. & Sav". Tropicos. Missouri Botanical Garden. 2019.
- WCSP. "Daphniphyllum humile Maxim. ex Franch. & Sav". World Checklist of Selected Plant Families (WCSP). Royal Botanic Gardens, Kew.
