= Caledonispa freycinetiae =

Scientific classification
- Kingdom: Animalia
- Phylum: Arthropoda
- Clade: Pancrustacea
- Class: Insecta
- Order: Coleoptera
- Suborder: Polyphaga
- Infraorder: Cucujiformia
- Family: Chrysomelidae
- Genus: Caledonispa
- Species: C. freycinetiae

Binomial name
- Caledonispa freycinetiae Gressitt, 1960

Species of beetle

Caledonispa freycinetiae is a species of beetle of the family Chrysomelidae. It is found in New Caledonia.

== Description ==
Adults reach a length of about 14–16.4 mm. They are reddish brown to pitchy or pale yellow. The head is pale reddish brown and the antennae are red (becoming pitchy apically). The prothorax is reddish brown, but slightly pitchy on the apical margin. The elytra are mostly reddish brown.

The larvae are pale creamy white, in part testaceous to pitchy black. They reach a length of about 25.5 mm.

== Life history ==
The recorded host plants for this species are Freycinetia (adults) and Ptychosperma (larvae) species. The adults feed in the crowns of Freycinetia vines. The larvae bore in the top of the shoot at the base of the crown, in small palms of the genus Ptychosperma species.
