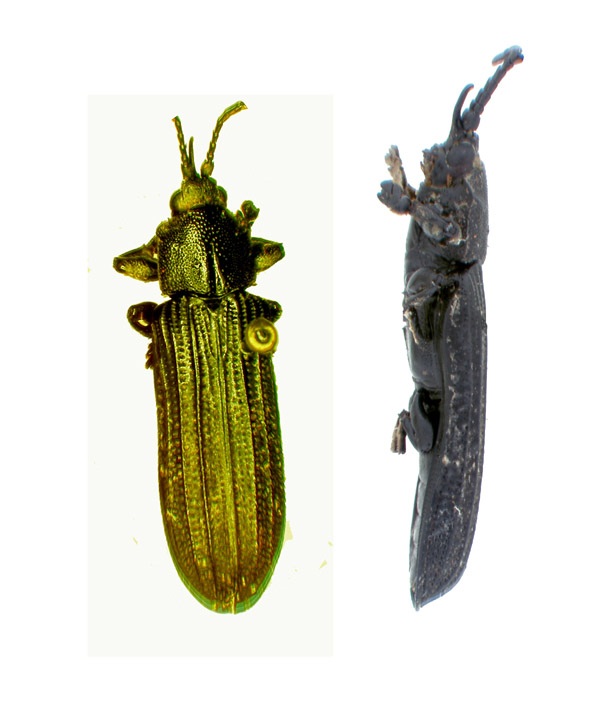

Scientific classification
- Kingdom: Animalia
- Phylum: Arthropoda
- Clade: Pancrustacea
- Class: Insecta
- Order: Coleoptera
- Suborder: Polyphaga
- Infraorder: Cucujiformia
- Family: Chrysomelidae
- Genus: Caledonispa
- Species: C. sarasini

Binomial name
- Caledonispa sarasini (Heller, 1916)

Synonyms
- Brontispa sarasini Heller, 1916

= Caledonispa sarasini =

Species of beetle

Caledonispa sarasini is a species of beetle of the family Chrysomelidae. It is found in New Caledonia.

== Life history ==
The recorded host plants for this species are Pandanus species. Records from Cocos nucifera are based on misidentifications. The adults feed in the crowns of their host plant. The larvae however are thought to feed on Ptychosperma palms which grow in the same plant association.
