= Ischnispa sulcata =

Scientific classification
- Kingdom: Animalia
- Phylum: Arthropoda
- Clade: Pancrustacea
- Class: Insecta
- Order: Coleoptera
- Suborder: Polyphaga
- Infraorder: Cucujiformia
- Family: Chrysomelidae
- Genus: Ischnispa
- Species: I. sulcata

Binomial name
- Ischnispa sulcata Gressitt, 1963

Species of beetle

Ischnispa sulcata is a species of beetle of the family Chrysomelidae. It is found in New Guinea.

== Description ==
Adults reach a length of about 7.6 mm. The head, antennae, prothorax and scutellum ae orange ochraceous, slightly paler at the sides of pronotum. The elytra are reddish ochraceous, but pitchy beyond the basal one-third, with the suture, external margin and costae pitchy blackish.

== Life history ==
No host plant has been documented for this species.
