= Cryptonychus murrayi =

Scientific classification
- Kingdom: Animalia
- Phylum: Arthropoda
- Clade: Pancrustacea
- Class: Insecta
- Order: Coleoptera
- Suborder: Polyphaga
- Infraorder: Cucujiformia
- Family: Chrysomelidae
- Genus: Cryptonychus
- Species: C. murrayi

Binomial name
- Cryptonychus murrayi Baly, 1858

Synonyms
- Cryptonychus bigotii Thomson, 1858; Cryptonychus reichenowi Kolbe, 1899; Cryptonychus murrayi cornuta Uhmann, 1953; Cryptonychus murrayi inapicalis Uhmann, 1958

Species of beetle

Cryptonychus murrayi is a species of beetle of the family Chrysomelidae. It is found in Cameroon, Equatorial Guinea, Gabon, Kenya, Nigeria, Senegal, Togo and Uganda.

== Life history ==
The recorded host plants for this species are Amomum and Aframomum species.
