= Cryptonychus nigrofasciatus =

Scientific classification
- Kingdom: Animalia
- Phylum: Arthropoda
- Clade: Pancrustacea
- Class: Insecta
- Order: Coleoptera
- Suborder: Polyphaga
- Infraorder: Cucujiformia
- Family: Chrysomelidae
- Genus: Cryptonychus
- Species: C. nigrofasciatus

Binomial name
- Cryptonychus nigrofasciatus Pic, 1934

Synonyms
- Cryptonychus aberrans Uhmann, 1936

Species of beetle

Cryptonychus nigrofasciatus is a species of beetle of the family Chrysomelidae. It is found in Cameroon, Congo, Gabon and Uganda.

== Life history ==
No host plant has been documented for this species.
