= Teretrispa orchidaceae =

Scientific classification
- Kingdom: Animalia
- Phylum: Arthropoda
- Clade: Pancrustacea
- Class: Insecta
- Order: Coleoptera
- Suborder: Polyphaga
- Infraorder: Cucujiformia
- Family: Chrysomelidae
- Genus: Teretrispa
- Species: T. orchidaceae

Binomial name
- Teretrispa orchidaceae Gressitt, 1960

Species of beetle

Teretrispa orchidaceae is a species of beetle of the family Chrysomelidae. It is found in New Caledonia.

== Description ==
Adults reach a length of about 8.6 mm. They are shiny black, the elytra each with two orange yellow stripes.

== Life history ==
The recorded host plants for this species are wild orchids (Orchidaceae).
