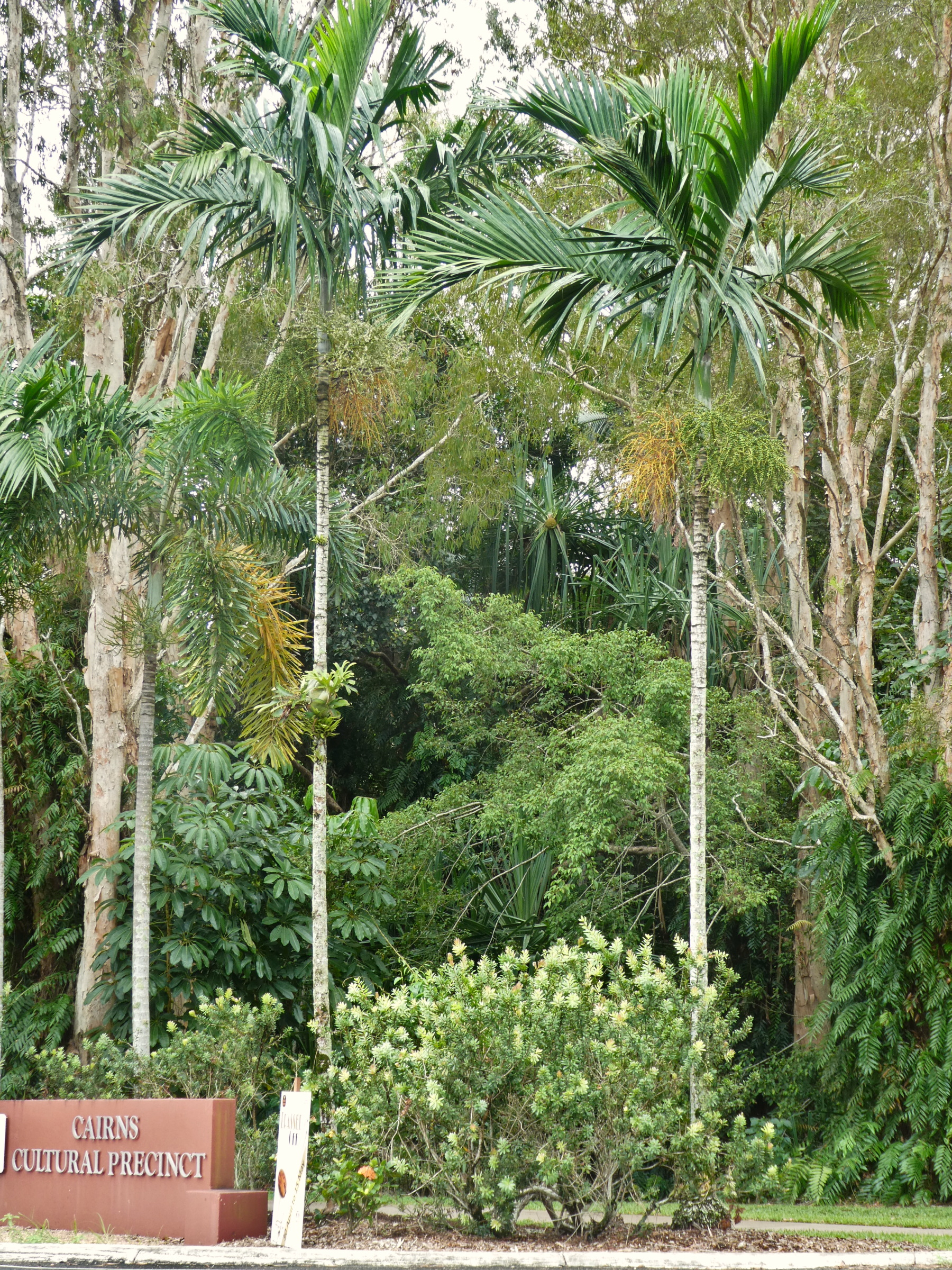

Conservation status
- Least Concern (NCA)

Scientific classification
- Kingdom: Plantae
- Clade: Tracheophytes
- Clade: Angiosperms
- Clade: Monocots
- Clade: Commelinids
- Order: Arecales
- Family: Arecaceae
- Genus: Ptychosperma
- Species: P. elegans

Binomial name
- Ptychosperma elegans (R.Br.) Blume

Synonyms
- Actinophloeus capitis-yorki (H.Wendl. & Drude) Burret; Archontophoenix jardinei F.M.Bailey; Archontophoenix veitchii H.Wendl. & Drude; Ptychosperma capitis-yorki H.Wendl. & Drude; Ptychosperma elegans var. sphaerocarpum Becc.; Ptychosperma jardinei (F.M.Bailey) F.M.Bailey; Ptychosperma seaforthii Miq.; Ptychosperma wendlandianum Burret; Ptychosperma wendlandianum var. sphaerocarpum (Becc.) Burret; Saguaster capitis-yorki (H.Wendl. & Drude) Kuntze; Saguaster elegans (R.Br.) Kuntze; Seaforthia elegans R.Br.

= Ptychosperma elegans =

Solitaire palm

Species of palm endemic to Australia

Ptychosperma elegans, commonly known as the solitaire palm (or elegant palm after the scientific name), is a very slender palm endemic to Queensland in Australia. In the nursery trade and in the United States it may be confusingly referred to as Alexander palm, which is an often-used but misnomered name of another Australian palm species Archontophoenix alexandrae, the Alexandra palm (note the difference in gender between the two names).

== Description ==
Ptychosperma elegans is a solitary-stemmed palm growing to a height of 10–12 m (33–39 ft). The slender stem measures up to 8–10 cm (3.1–3.9 in) in diameter, is slightly bulging at the base, is light grey in colour, and has prominent leaf scars encircling the trunk.

The crown usually has 7 to 11 pinnate fronds that reach lengths of around 3 metres (9.8 ft). The petiole (leaf stem) is around 30 cm (12 in) long; the crownshaft around 60 cm (24 in) long and mid-green in colour with a whitish waxy coating. The pinnae (leaflets) number between 30 and 60 on each side of the rachis or midrib, measure up to 84 cm (33 in) in length at the middle of the frond and shorter at each end, and have an obliquely praemorse tip (i.e. with a jagged edge like a fishtail).

Inflorescences are about 70 cm (28 in) long and produced on the trunk just below the crownshaft. Flowers are grouped in sets of 3, each with one pistillate (functionally female) and two staminate (functionally male) flowers. They are light green with 3 sepals and 3 petals; staminate flowers are about 6 mm (0.24 in) long with 12–22 stamens, pistilate flowers measure about 5 mm (0.20 in) and have 6 staminodes and a 1 mm (0.039 in) recurved stigma.

Fruits of Ptychosperma elegans measure 9–15 mm (0.35–0.59 in) long and 8–10 mm (0.31–0.39 in) wide, are bright red when ripe and the remains of the stigma is attached at one end. There is a thin layer of flesh around the solitary seed, which is about 10 mm (0.39 in) long and 7 mm (0.28 in) wide with five deep longitudinal grooves.

== Taxonomy and etymology ==
Originally described as Seaforthia elegans in 1810 by Robert Brown in his work Prodromus Florae Novae Hollandiae et Insulae Van Diemen, it was given its current binomial name in 1843 by Carl Ludwig Blume in his publication Rumphia, sive, Commentationes botanicæ imprimis de plantis Indiæ Orientalis.

The genus name Ptychosperma is derived from the Ancient Greek word ptukhḗ, meaning "a fold"; and spérma, "seed". The species epithet elegans comes from the Latin term ēlegāns meaning "graceful" or "elegant".

== Distribution and habitat ==
The species is endemic to Queensland, Australia, where it grows in both tropical and sub-tropical rainforests as an understory tree, often close to rivers and streams where there is plentiful water and good drainage. Its altitudinal range is from sea level to 900 m (3,000 ft).

== Cultivation ==
The tropical species is a popular palm in gardens and parks, where its arched crown, slender trunk, and red fruit are regarded as appealing feature. They are less successful in cooler climates and somewhat to susceptible to frosts. Plants grown in pots or indoors require high amounts of light with humid and warm conditions. A blight that covers leaves with dark brown patches, especially in sub-tropical climates, does not seem to interfere with a specimen's growth. Ptychosperma elegans is cultivated as an ornamental tree for planting in temperate climate gardens and parks. It is a single trunked tree, that in cultivation can reach 20–40 feet (6.1–12.2 m) in height.

It has been naturalized in South Florida since at least the 1950s, and remains the only member of its genus naturalized in the US. Due to its intolerance of cold, it is mostly found in South Florida and coastal Tampa. It also is used in Coastal Southern California, primarily Orange and San Diego counties.

== Gallery ==
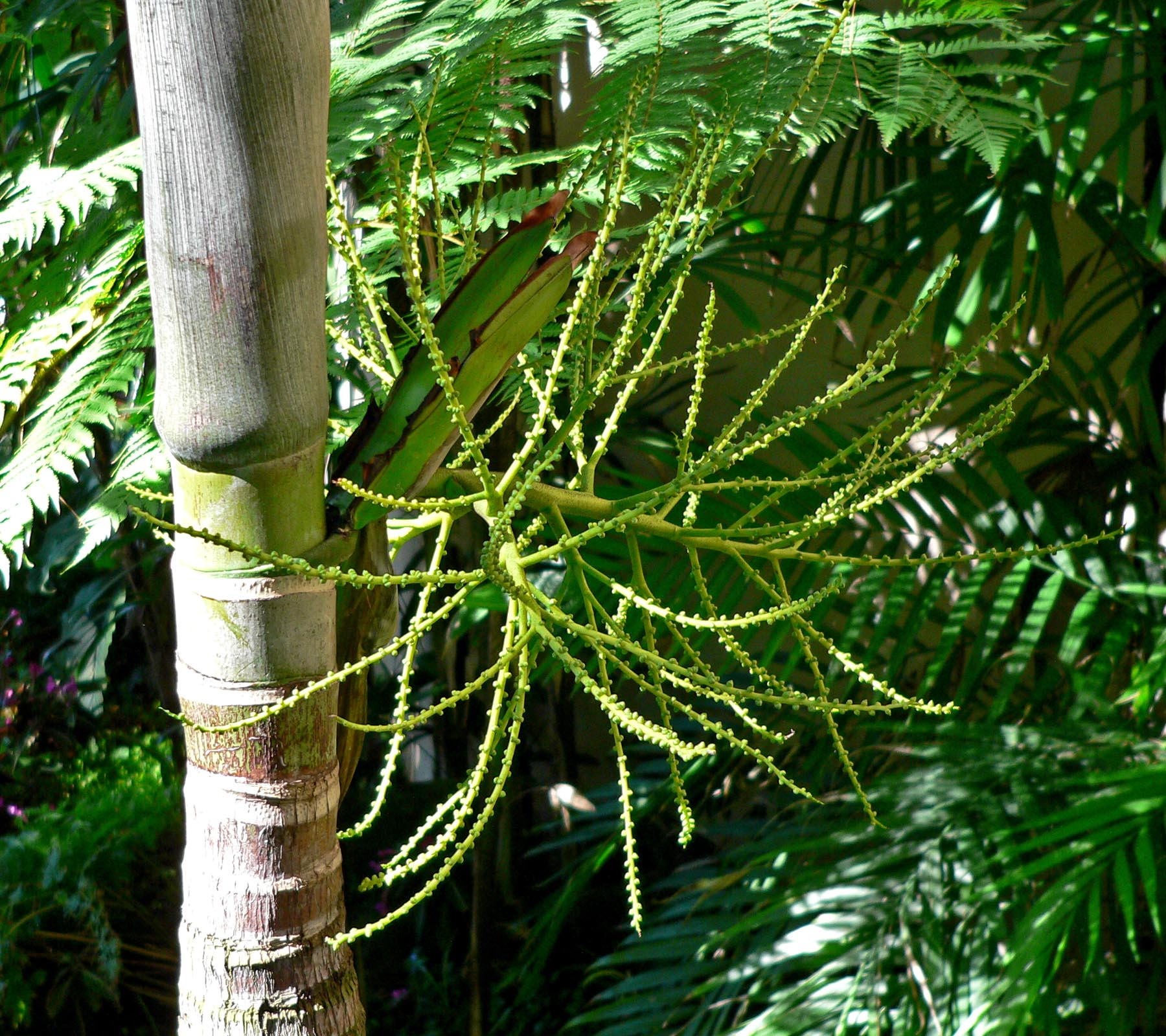
Inflorescence

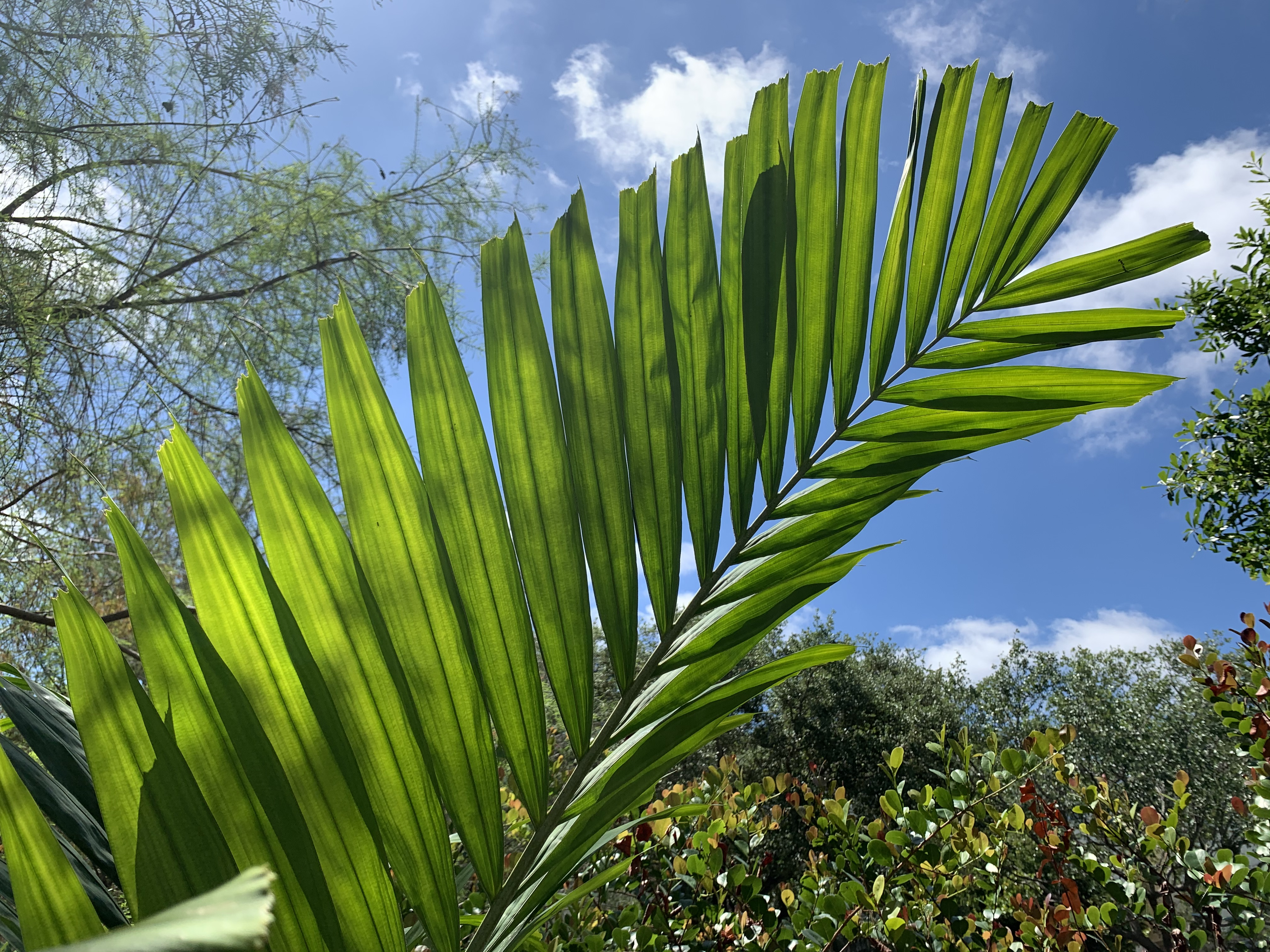
Characteristic blunt leaf tips

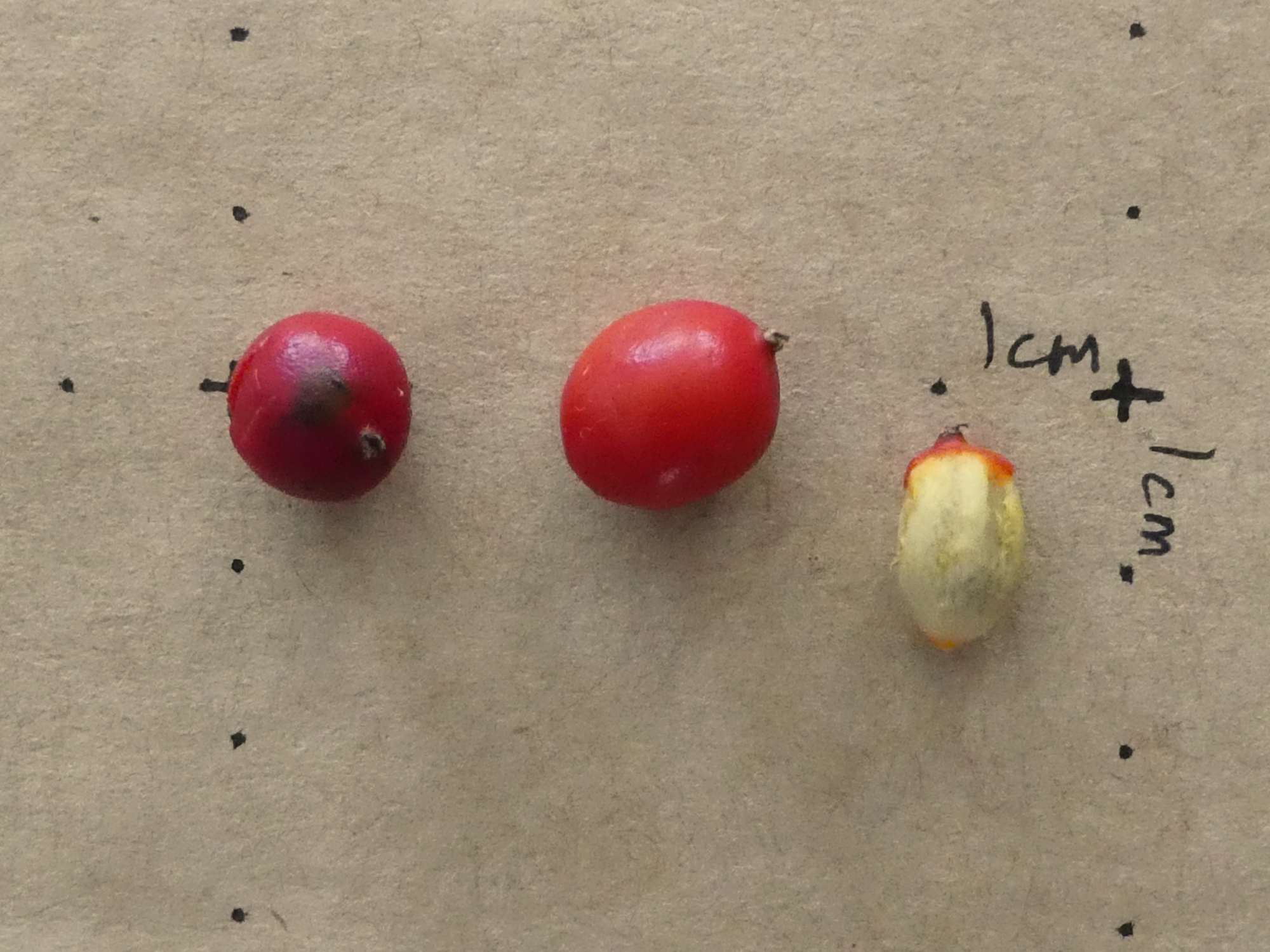
Fruits and seed

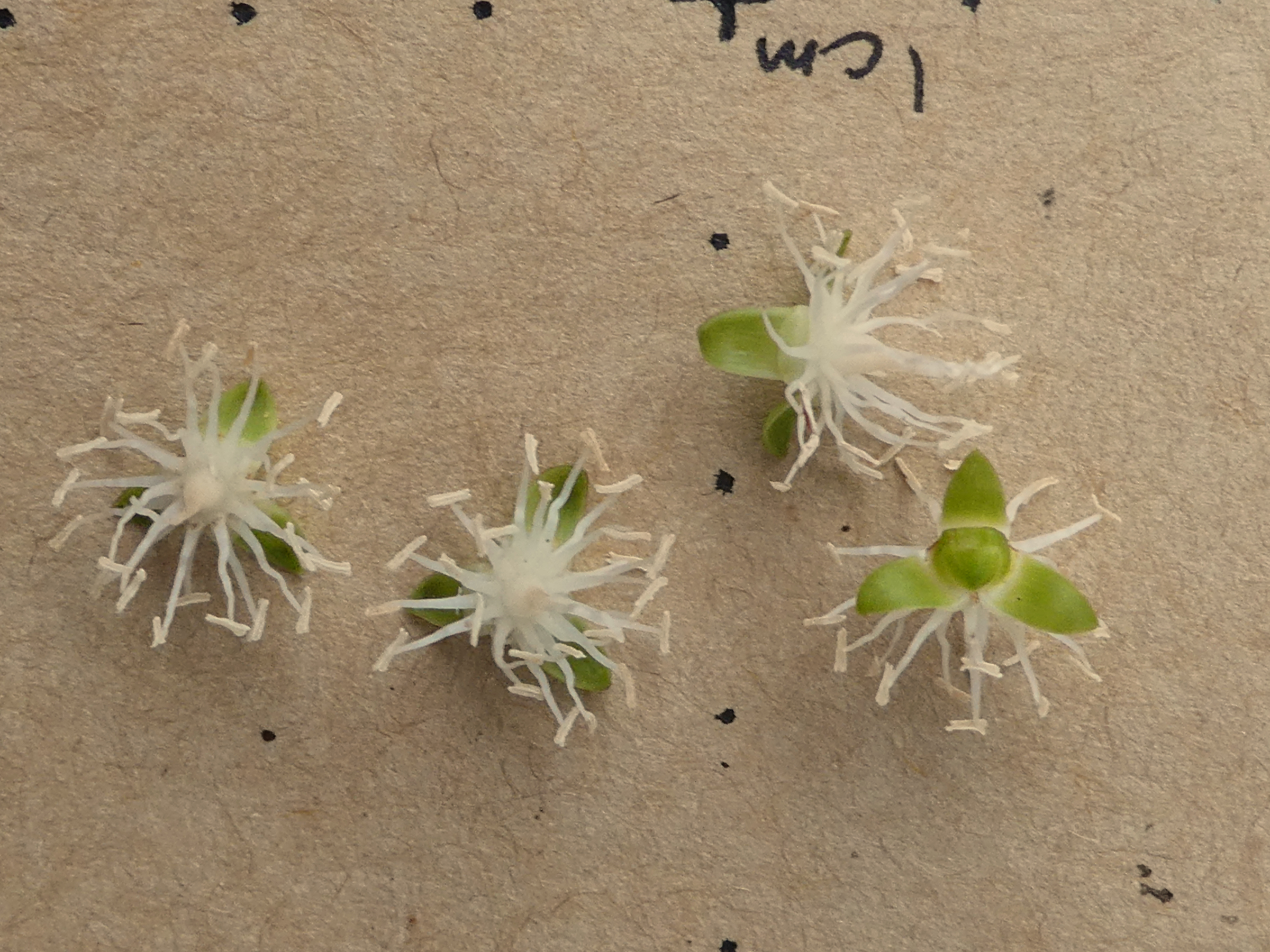
Staminate flowers

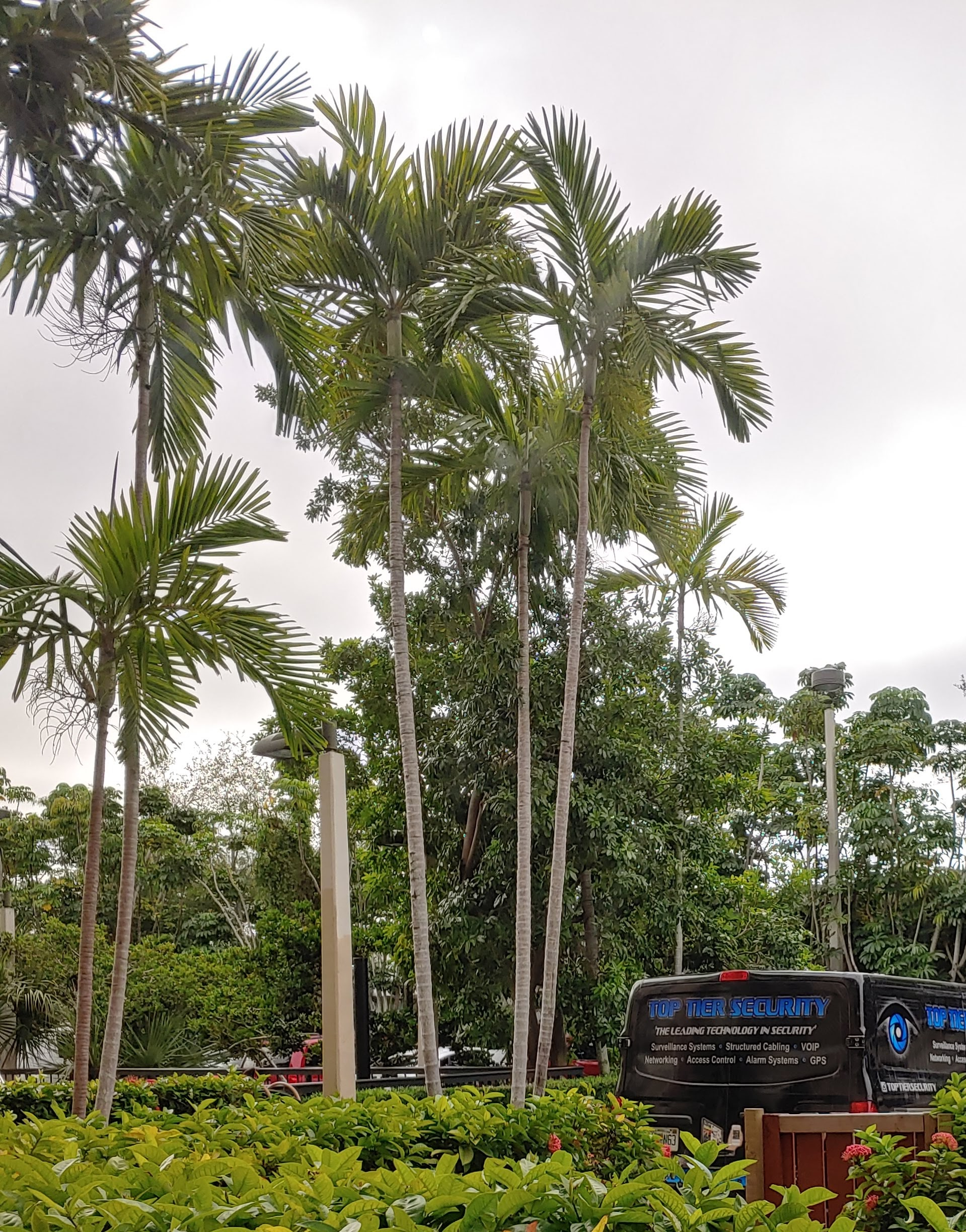
Group of mature trees in Miami, Florida

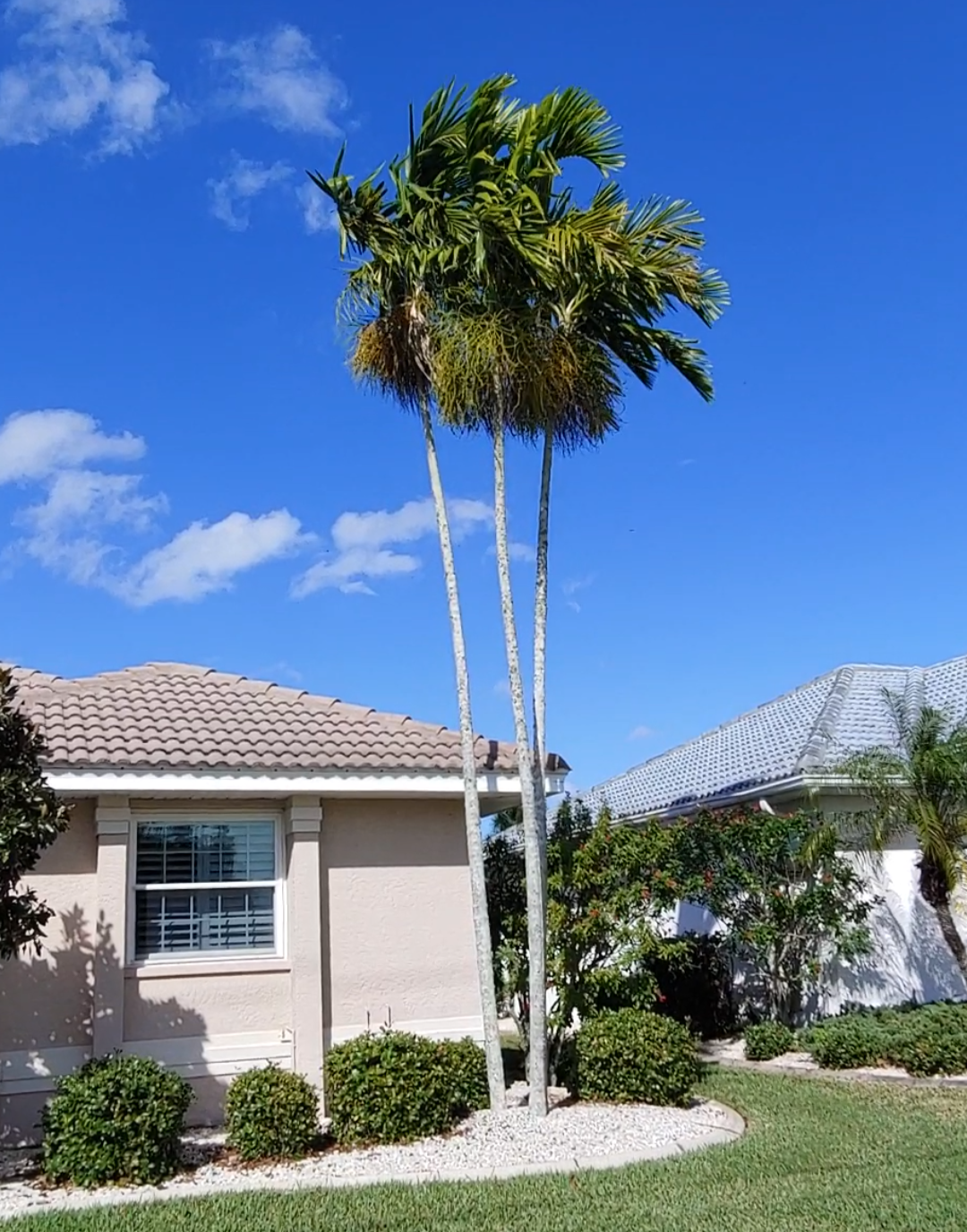
Laden with fruit

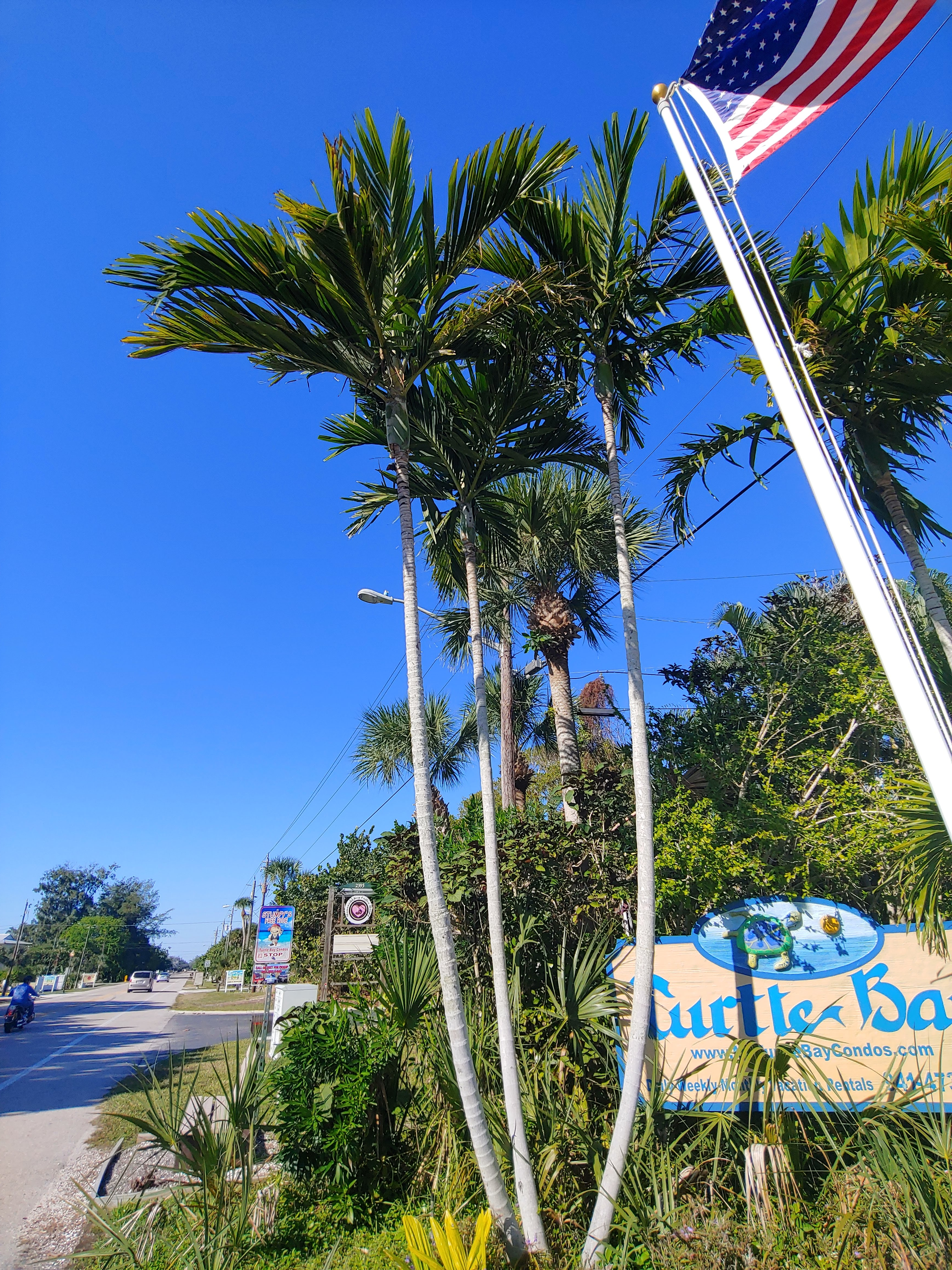
Group in Englewood, Florida

== See also ==
- Archontophoenix alexandrae – the similarly named Alexandra palm
- Adonidia – a palm genus with similar appearance
