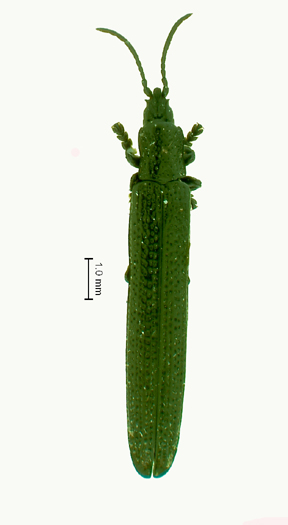

Scientific classification
- Kingdom: Animalia
- Phylum: Arthropoda
- Clade: Pancrustacea
- Class: Insecta
- Order: Coleoptera
- Suborder: Polyphaga
- Infraorder: Cucujiformia
- Family: Chrysomelidae
- Genus: Ischnispa
- Species: I. nigra

Binomial name
- Ischnispa nigra Gressitt, 1963

= Ischnispa nigra =

Species of beetle

Ischnispa nigra is a species of beetle of the family Chrysomelidae. It is found in north-eastern New Guinea.

== Description ==
Adults reach a length of about 6.7 mm. They are black on the upper side, while the abdomen is largely pitchy brown.

== Life history ==
No host plant has been documented for this species.
