= Teretrispa =

Scientific classification
- Kingdom: Animalia
- Phylum: Arthropoda
- Clade: Pancrustacea
- Class: Insecta
- Order: Coleoptera
- Suborder: Polyphaga
- Infraorder: Cucujiformia
- Family: Chrysomelidae
- Subfamily: Cassidinae
- Tribe: Cryptonychini
- Genus: Teretrispa; Gressitt, 1960

Genus of leaf beetles

Teretrispa is a genus of beetles belonging to the family Chrysomelidae.

== Species ==
- Teretrispa gahniae Gressitt, 1960
- Teretrispa orchidaceae Gressitt, 1960
