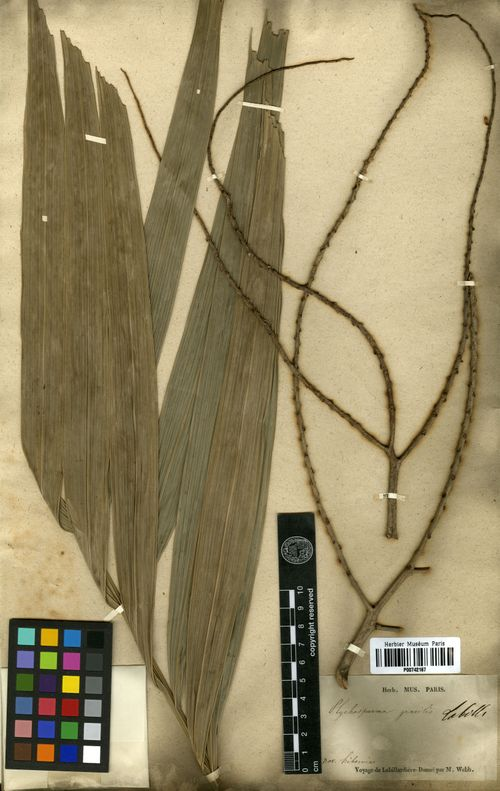

Conservation status
- Near Threatened (IUCN 3.1)

Scientific classification
- Kingdom: Plantae
- Clade: Tracheophytes
- Clade: Angiosperms
- Clade: Monocots
- Clade: Commelinids
- Order: Arecales
- Family: Arecaceae
- Genus: Ptychosperma
- Species: P. gracile

Binomial name
- Ptychosperma gracile Labill.

Synonyms
- Ptychosperma hartmannii Becc.; Saguaster gracilis (Labill.) Kuntze; Seaforthia ptychosperma Mart.

= Ptychosperma gracile =

Species of palm

Ptychosperma gracile is a species of palm tree. It is endemic to Papua New Guinea, including Woodlark Island (Muyua) in the Louisiade Archipelago, the Bismarck Archipelago, and Buka in the Solomon Islands. It grows in lowland rain forests. It has declined due to the loss of habitat to agriculture.
