= Palmispa parallela =

Scientific classification
- Kingdom: Animalia
- Phylum: Arthropoda
- Clade: Pancrustacea
- Class: Insecta
- Order: Coleoptera
- Suborder: Polyphaga
- Infraorder: Cucujiformia
- Family: Chrysomelidae
- Genus: Palmispa
- Species: P. parallela

Binomial name
- Palmispa parallela Gressitt, 1960

Species of beetle

Palmispa parallela is a species of beetle of the family Chrysomelidae. It is found in north-eastern New Guinea.

== Description ==
Adults reach a length of about 4.6 mm. They are black to pale testaceous. The head is pitchy black above, becoming reddish anteriorly and ochraceous beneath. The antennae are brownish ochraceous and the elytra are blackish pitchy with a reddish tinge.

== Life history ==
The recorded host plants for this species are Calamus species and Korthalsia beccarii.
