= Cryptonychini =

- Brontispa longissima

Scientific classification
- Kingdom: Animalia
- Phylum: Arthropoda
- Clade: Pancrustacea
- Class: Insecta
- Order: Coleoptera
- Suborder: Polyphaga
- Infraorder: Cucujiformia
- Family: Chrysomelidae
- Subfamily: Cassidinae
- Tribe: Cryptonychini; Chapuis, 1875

Genera
- See text

Tribe of beetles

Cryptonychini is a tribe of beetles in the subfamily Cassidinae (tortoise and leaf-mining beetles).

== Genera ==
- Aulostyrax
- Brontispa
- Calamispa
- Caledonispa
- Callistola
- Ceratispa
- Cryptonychus
- Drescheria
- Gestronella
- Gyllenhaleus
- Ischnispa
- Isopedhispa
- Nesohispa
- Octodonta
- Oxycephala
- Palmispa
- Plesispa
- Stephanispa
- Teretrispa
- Torquispa
- Xiphispa
