= Caledonispa =

Scientific classification
- Kingdom: Animalia
- Phylum: Arthropoda
- Clade: Pancrustacea
- Class: Insecta
- Order: Coleoptera
- Suborder: Polyphaga
- Infraorder: Cucujiformia
- Family: Chrysomelidae
- Subfamily: Cassidinae
- Tribe: Cryptonychini
- Genus: Caledonispa; Uhmann, 1952

Genus of leaf beetles

Caledonispa is a genus of beetles belonging to the family Chrysomelidae.

== Species ==
- Caledonispa freycinetiae Gressitt, 1960
- Caledonispa sarasini (Heller, 1916)
