= Cryptonychus porrectus =

Scientific classification
- Kingdom: Animalia
- Phylum: Arthropoda
- Clade: Pancrustacea
- Class: Insecta
- Order: Coleoptera
- Suborder: Polyphaga
- Infraorder: Cucujiformia
- Family: Chrysomelidae
- Genus: Cryptonychus
- Species: C. porrectus

Binomial name
- Cryptonychus porrectus (Gyllenhal, 1817)

Synonyms
- Hispa porrectus Gyllenhal, 1817; Cryptonychus gestroi Achard, 1917; Cryptonychus nyassicus Kolbe, 1899; Cryptonychus punctatostriatus Kraatz, 1895; Alurnus rostratus Kirby, 1818

Species of beetle

Cryptonychus porrectus is a species of beetle of the family Chrysomelidae. It is found in Cameroon, Congo, Equatorial Guinea, Guinea Bissau, Senegal, Sierra Leone and Togo.

== Life history ==
The recorded host plant for this species is Oryza sativa.
