= Cryptonychus dubius =

Scientific classification
- Kingdom: Animalia
- Phylum: Arthropoda
- Clade: Pancrustacea
- Class: Insecta
- Order: Coleoptera
- Suborder: Polyphaga
- Infraorder: Cucujiformia
- Family: Chrysomelidae
- Genus: Cryptonychus
- Species: C. dubius

Binomial name
- Cryptonychus dubius Baly, 1858

Synonyms
- Cryptonychus dubius unicolor Kolbe, 1899; Cryptonychus rufipes Pic, 1924; Cryptonychus dubius obscurus Pic, 1934

Species of beetle

Cryptonychus dubius is a species of beetle of the family Chrysomelidae. It is found in Cameroon, Congo, Equatorial Guinea, Gabon, Guinea, Nigeria and Uganda.

== Life history ==
No host plant has been documented for this species.
