= Gyllenhaleus feae =

Scientific classification
- Kingdom: Animalia
- Phylum: Arthropoda
- Clade: Pancrustacea
- Class: Insecta
- Order: Coleoptera
- Suborder: Polyphaga
- Infraorder: Cucujiformia
- Family: Chrysomelidae
- Genus: Gyllenhaleus
- Species: G. feae

Binomial name
- Gyllenhaleus feae Gestro, 1903

Synonyms
- Cryptonychus (Gyllenhaleus) concolor Uhmann, 1930

Species of beetle

Gyllenhaleus feae is a species of beetle of the family Chrysomelidae. It is found in Congo and Equatorial Guinea.

== Life history ==
No host plant has been documented for this species.
