= Ischnispa =

Scientific classification
- Kingdom: Animalia
- Phylum: Arthropoda
- Clade: Pancrustacea
- Class: Insecta
- Order: Coleoptera
- Suborder: Polyphaga
- Infraorder: Cucujiformia
- Family: Chrysomelidae
- Subfamily: Cassidinae
- Tribe: Cryptonychini
- Genus: Ischnispa; Gressitt 1963

Genus of leaf beetles

Ischnispa is a genus of beetles belonging to the family Chrysomelidae.

== Species ==
- Ischnispa nigra Gressitt, 1963
- Ischnispa sulcata Gressitt, 1963
