= Stephanispa cohici =

Scientific classification
- Kingdom: Animalia
- Phylum: Arthropoda
- Clade: Pancrustacea
- Class: Insecta
- Order: Coleoptera
- Suborder: Polyphaga
- Infraorder: Cucujiformia
- Family: Chrysomelidae
- Genus: Stephanispa
- Species: S. cohici

Binomial name
- Stephanispa cohici Gressitt, 1960

Species of beetle

Stephanispa cohici is a species of beetle of the family Chrysomelidae. It is found in New Caledonia.

== Description ==
Adults reach a length of about 5.5-6.4 mm. They are pale testaceous to pitchy black. The head is pale with a pitchy stripe and a more blackish stripe. The antennae are ochraceous, but dark reddish brown on the last three segments above and last four beneath. The prothorax is pale, with a pitchy black median stripe and a more blackish stripe along the side. The elytra are ochraceous, with the discal carinae pale testaceous, and with three pitchy black stripes.

== Life history ==
The recorded host plants for this species are Freycinetia species.
