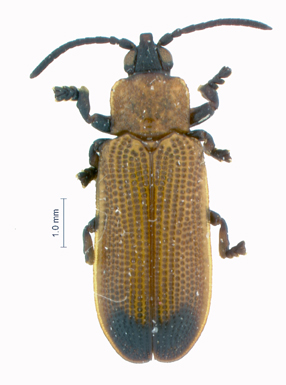

Scientific classification
- Kingdom: Animalia
- Phylum: Arthropoda
- Clade: Pancrustacea
- Class: Insecta
- Order: Coleoptera
- Suborder: Polyphaga
- Infraorder: Cucujiformia
- Family: Chrysomelidae
- Genus: Cryptonychus
- Species: C. breviceps

Binomial name
- Cryptonychus breviceps Weise, 1911

Synonyms
- Gyllenhalius palmarum Maulik, 1930

= Cryptonychus breviceps =

Species of beetle

Cryptonychus breviceps is a species of beetle of the family Chrysomelidae. It is found in Cameroon, Congo, Equatorial Guinea, Guinea, Ivory Coast and Nigeria.

== Life history ==
The recorded host plants for this species are Elaeis species, Cocos nucifera and Cocos romanzoffiana.
