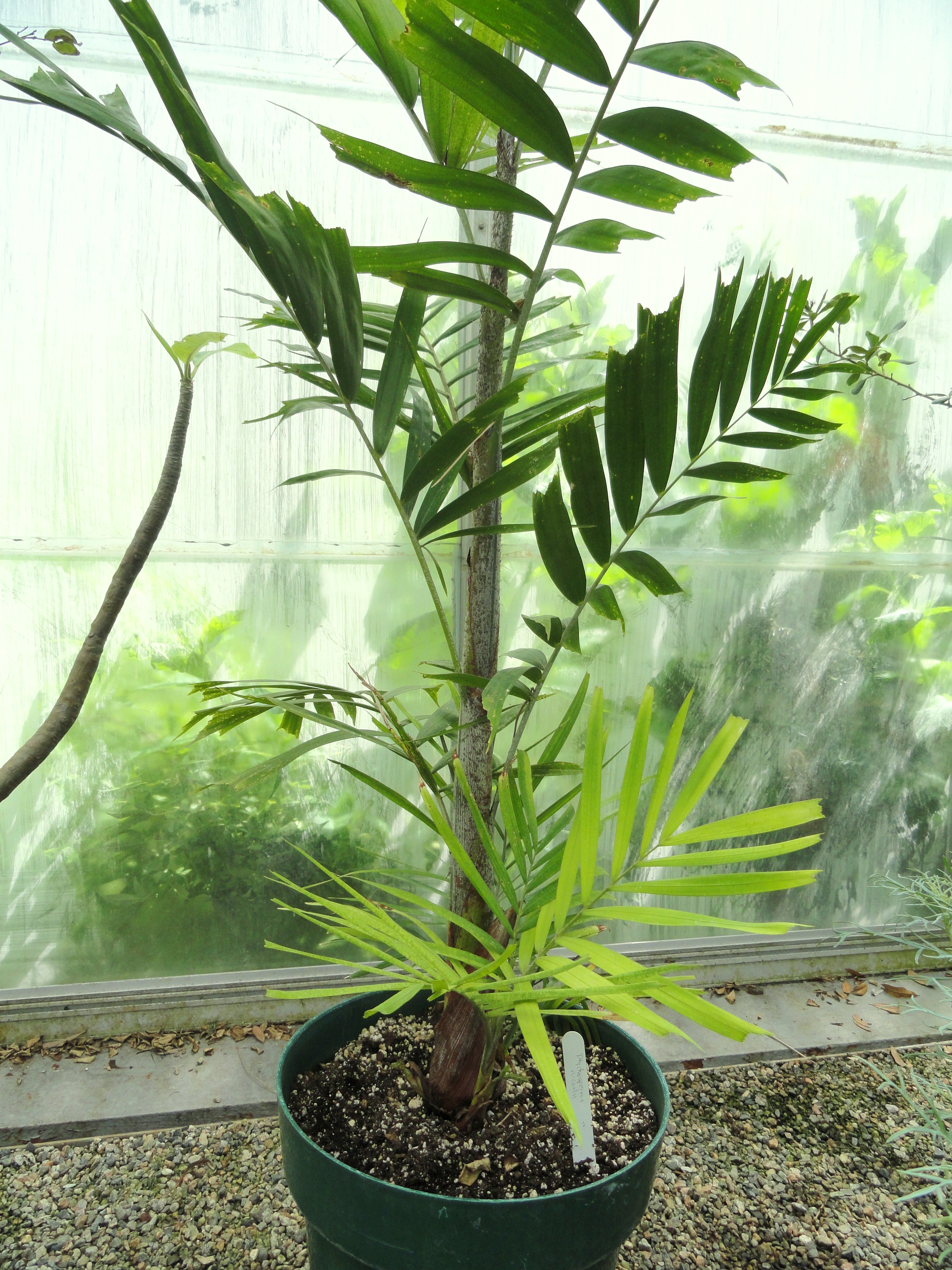

Scientific classification
- Kingdom: Plantae
- Clade: Tracheophytes
- Clade: Angiosperms
- Clade: Monocots
- Clade: Commelinids
- Order: Arecales
- Family: Arecaceae
- Genus: Ptychosperma
- Species: P. nicolai

Binomial name
- Ptychosperma nicolai (Sander ex André) Burret

Synonyms
- Actinophloeus nicolai (Sander ex André) Burret

= Ptychosperma nicolai =

Species of plant

Ptychosperma nicolai is a species of plant in the family Arecaceae, endemic to New Guinea. It grows up to 8 meters in height, with red fruit.

== Synonyms ==
- Actinophloeus nicolai (Sander ex André) Burret
- Romanovia nicolai Sander ex André
