= Palmispa korthalsivora =

Scientific classification
- Kingdom: Animalia
- Phylum: Arthropoda
- Clade: Pancrustacea
- Class: Insecta
- Order: Coleoptera
- Suborder: Polyphaga
- Infraorder: Cucujiformia
- Family: Chrysomelidae
- Genus: Palmispa
- Species: P. korthalsivora

Binomial name
- Palmispa korthalsivora Gressitt, 1960

Species of beetle

Palmispa korthalsivora is a species of beetle of the family Chrysomelidae. It is found in north-eastern New Guinea.

== Description ==
Adults reach a length of about 4.7 mm. They are black, with some reddish on the apex and at the base of the antennae, as well as on the side of the head and on some parts of the side of the thorax.

== Life history ==
The recorded host plant for this species is Korthalsia beccarii.
