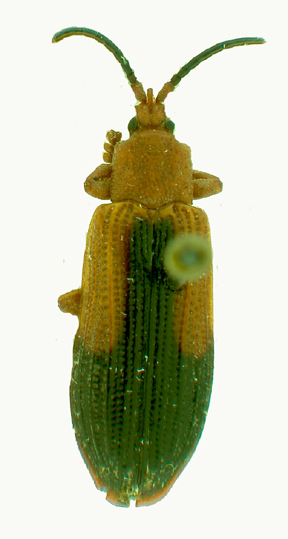

Scientific classification
- Kingdom: Animalia
- Phylum: Arthropoda
- Clade: Pancrustacea
- Class: Insecta
- Order: Coleoptera
- Suborder: Polyphaga
- Infraorder: Cucujiformia
- Family: Chrysomelidae
- Subfamily: Cassidinae
- Tribe: Cryptonychini
- Genus: Oxycephala; Guérin-Méneville, 1838
- Species: O. cornigera

Binomial name
- Oxycephala cornigera Guérin-Méneville, 1838

= Oxycephala =

Genus of beetles

Oxycephala is a genus of leaf beetles in the family Chrysomelidae. It is monotypic, being represented by the single species, Oxycephala cornigera, which is found on New Ireland and New Britain.

== Life history ==
The recorded host plants for this species are Cocos nucifera, Calamus, Heliconia and Pinanga species.
