= Isopedhispa =

Scientific classification
- Kingdom: Animalia
- Phylum: Arthropoda
- Clade: Pancrustacea
- Class: Insecta
- Order: Coleoptera
- Suborder: Polyphaga
- Infraorder: Cucujiformia
- Family: Chrysomelidae
- Subfamily: Cassidinae
- Tribe: Cryptonychini
- Genus: Isopedhispa; Spaeth, 1936

Genus of leaf beetles

Isopedhispa is a genus of beetles belonging to the family Chrysomelidae.

== Species ==
- Isopedhispa cocotis (Maulik, 1933)
- Isopedhispa ferruginea Spaeth, 1936
