= Gyllenhaleus =

Scientific classification
- Kingdom: Animalia
- Phylum: Arthropoda
- Clade: Pancrustacea
- Class: Insecta
- Order: Coleoptera
- Suborder: Polyphaga
- Infraorder: Cucujiformia
- Family: Chrysomelidae
- Subfamily: Cassidinae
- Tribe: Cryptonychini
- Genus: Gyllenhaleus; Weise, 1903

Synonyms
- Cryptonychus (Cryptonychinus) Spaeth, 1933

Genus of leaf beetles

Gyllenhaleus is a genus of beetles belonging to the family Chrysomelidae.

== Species ==
- Gyllenhaleus bipunctatus (Baly, 1858)
- Gyllenhaleus feae Gestro, 1903
- Gyllenhaleus macrorrhinus Gestro, 1906
