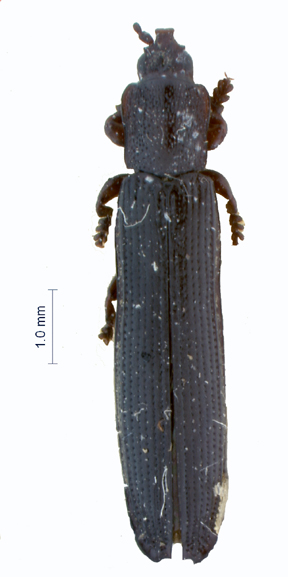

Scientific classification
- Kingdom: Animalia
- Phylum: Arthropoda
- Clade: Pancrustacea
- Class: Insecta
- Order: Coleoptera
- Suborder: Polyphaga
- Infraorder: Cucujiformia
- Family: Chrysomelidae
- Subfamily: Cassidinae
- Tribe: Cryptonychini
- Genus: Drescheria; Weise, 1922
- Species: D. reinecki

Binomial name
- Drescheria reinecki Weise, 1922

= Drescheria =

Genus of beetles

Drescheria is a genus of leaf beetles in the family Chrysomelidae. It is monotypic, being represented by the single species, Drescheria reinecki, which is found in Indonesia (Java).

== Life history ==
The recorded host plants for this species are bamboo species (Poaceae).
