= Gyllenhaleus macrorhinus =

Scientific classification
- Kingdom: Animalia
- Phylum: Arthropoda
- Clade: Pancrustacea
- Class: Insecta
- Order: Coleoptera
- Suborder: Polyphaga
- Infraorder: Cucujiformia
- Family: Chrysomelidae
- Genus: Gyllenhaleus
- Species: G. macrorhinus

Binomial name
- Gyllenhaleus macrorhinus Gestro, 1906

Synonyms
- Cryptonychus (Gyllenhaleus) macrorhinus uniformis Uhmann, 1936

Species of beetle

Gyllenhaleus macrorhinus is a species of beetle of the family Chrysomelidae. It is found in Congo, Rwanda and Uganda.

== Life history ==
The recorded host plant for this species is Costus afer.
