= Aulostyrax =

Scientific classification
- Kingdom: Animalia
- Phylum: Arthropoda
- Clade: Pancrustacea
- Class: Insecta
- Order: Coleoptera
- Suborder: Polyphaga
- Infraorder: Cucujiformia
- Family: Chrysomelidae
- Subfamily: Cassidinae
- Tribe: Cryptonychini
- Genus: Aulostyrax; Maulik, 1929

Genus of leaf beetles

Aulostyrax is a genus of beetles belonging to the family Chrysomelidae.

== Species ==
- Aulostyrax heterospathi Gressitt, 1957
- Aulostyrax nuciferae Maulik, 1929
