= Isopedhispa ferruginea =

Scientific classification
- Kingdom: Animalia
- Phylum: Arthropoda
- Clade: Pancrustacea
- Class: Insecta
- Order: Coleoptera
- Suborder: Polyphaga
- Infraorder: Cucujiformia
- Family: Chrysomelidae
- Genus: Isopedhispa
- Species: I. ferruginea

Binomial name
- Isopedhispa ferruginea Spaeth, 1936

Species of beetle

Isopedhispa ferruginea is a species of beetle of the family Chrysomelidae. It is found in New Caledonia.

== Life history ==
No host plant has been documented for this species, but it presumably feeds on a native palm species.
