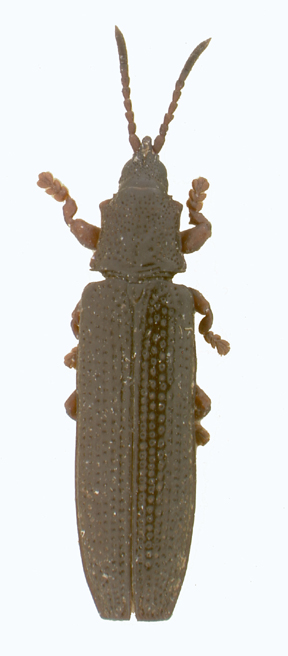

Scientific classification
- Kingdom: Animalia
- Phylum: Arthropoda
- Clade: Pancrustacea
- Class: Insecta
- Order: Coleoptera
- Suborder: Polyphaga
- Infraorder: Cucujiformia
- Family: Chrysomelidae
- Subfamily: Cassidinae
- Tribe: Cryptonychini
- Genus: Nesohispa; Maulik, 1913
- Species: N. lambaciras

Binomial name
- Nesohispa lambaciras Maulik, 1913

= Nesohispa =

Genus of beetles

Nesohispa is a genus of leaf beetles in the family Chrysomelidae. It is monotypic, being represented by the single species, Nesohispa lambaciras, which is found on the Seychelles.

== Life history ==
The recorded host plants for this species are Stevensonia and Phoenicophorium species.
