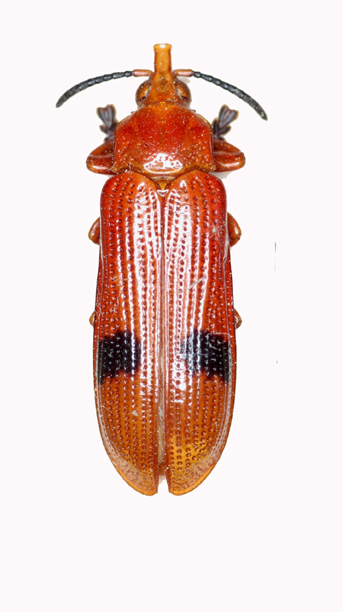

Scientific classification
- Kingdom: Animalia
- Phylum: Arthropoda
- Clade: Pancrustacea
- Class: Insecta
- Order: Coleoptera
- Suborder: Polyphaga
- Infraorder: Cucujiformia
- Family: Chrysomelidae
- Genus: Gyllenhaleus
- Species: G. bipunctatus

Binomial name
- Gyllenhaleus bipunctatus (Baly, 1858)

Synonyms
- Cryptonychus bipunctatus Baly, 1858; Gyllenhaleus bipunctatus quadrimaculatus Gestro, 1906; Cryptonychus (Gyllenhaleus) schubotzi Weise, 1915; Cryptonychus (Gyllenhaleus) bipunctatus subnotata Pic, 1924

= Gyllenhaleus bipunctatus =

Species of beetle

Gyllenhaleus bipunctatus is a species of beetle of the family Chrysomelidae. It is found in Cameroon, Congo, Equatorial Guinea and Gabon.

== Life history ==
The recorded host plants for this species are Costus afer, Amomum and Aframomum species.
