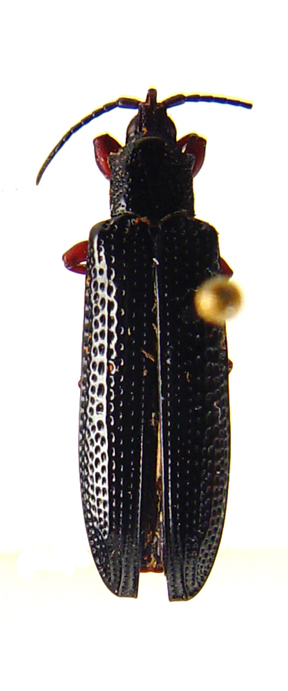

Scientific classification
- Kingdom: Animalia
- Phylum: Arthropoda
- Clade: Pancrustacea
- Class: Insecta
- Order: Coleoptera
- Suborder: Polyphaga
- Infraorder: Cucujiformia
- Family: Chrysomelidae
- Genus: Torquispa
- Species: T. caledoniae

Binomial name
- Torquispa caledoniae Uhmann, 1954

= Torquispa caledoniae =

Species of beetle

Torquispa caledoniae is a species of beetle of the family Chrysomelidae. It is found in New Caledonia.

== Life history ==
No host plant has been documented for this species.
