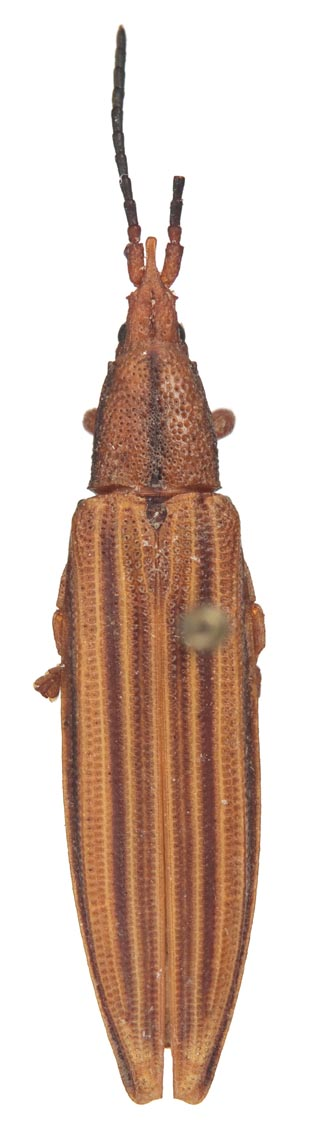

Scientific classification
- Kingdom: Animalia
- Phylum: Arthropoda
- Clade: Pancrustacea
- Class: Insecta
- Order: Coleoptera
- Suborder: Polyphaga
- Infraorder: Cucujiformia
- Family: Chrysomelidae
- Subfamily: Cassidinae
- Tribe: Cryptonychini
- Genus: Xiphispa; Chapuis, 1878
- Species: X. coquereli

Binomial name
- Xiphispa coquereli (Fairmaire, 1869)

Synonyms
- Oxycephala coquereli Fairmaire, 1869; Oxycephala coquereli multivittata Pic, 1924

= Xiphispa =

Genus of beetles

Xiphispa is a genus of leaf beetles in the family Chrysomelidae. It is monotypic, being represented by the single species, Xiphispa coquereli, which is found in Madagascar.

== Life history ==
No host plant has been documented for this species.
