= Cryptonychus =

Scientific classification
- Kingdom: Animalia
- Phylum: Arthropoda
- Clade: Pancrustacea
- Class: Insecta
- Order: Coleoptera
- Suborder: Polyphaga
- Infraorder: Cucujiformia
- Family: Chrysomelidae
- Subfamily: Cassidinae
- Tribe: Cryptonychini
- Genus: Cryptonychus; Gyllenhal, 1817

Synonyms
- Cryptonychus (Aulocryptonychus) Spaeth, 1933; Cryptonychus (Cochleocryptonychus) Spaeth, 1933; Cryptonychus (Paracryptonychus) Spaeth, 1933

Genus of leaf beetles

Cryptonychus is a genus of beetles belonging to the family Chrysomelidae.

== Species ==
- Subgenus Cryptonychus
  - Cryptonychus apicalis Pic, 1924
  - Cryptonychus apicicornis Kolbe, 1899
  - Cryptonychus barombicus Kolbe, 1899
  - Cryptonychus brevicollis Gestro, 1906
  - Cryptonychus crassirostris Gestro, 1906
  - Cryptonychus cribricollis Gestro, 1906
  - Cryptonychus devius Kolbe, 1899
  - Cryptonychus discolor Gestro, 1906
  - Cryptonychus dubius Baly, 1858
  - Cryptonychus extremus Péringuey, 1898
  - Cryptonychus gracilicornis Kolbe, 1899
  - Cryptonychus interpres Kolbe, 1899
  - Cryptonychus kolbei Weise, 1913
  - Cryptonychus leonardi Gestro, 1906
  - Cryptonychus leoninus Spaeth, 1933
  - Cryptonychus lionotus Kolbe, 1899
  - Cryptonychus murrayi Baly, 1858
  - Cryptonychus neavei Spaeth, 1933
  - Cryptonychus nigrofasciatus Pic, 1934
  - Cryptonychus porrectus Gyllenhal, 1817
  - Cryptonychus proboscideus Thomson, 1858
  - Cryptonychus procerus Weise, 1915
  - Cryptonychus schoutedeni Uhmann, 1937
  - Cryptonychus striolatus Uhmann, 1936
  - Cryptonychus tenuirostris Gestro, 1906
- Subgenus Cryptonychellus Weise, 1910
  - Cryptonychus angusticeps Gestro, 1907
  - Cryptonychus breviceps Weise, 1911
  - Cryptonychus exiguus Spaeth, 1933
  - Cryptonychus ferrugineus Spaeth, 1933
  - Cryptonychus sorex Uhmann, 1954
