= Cryptonychus interpres =

Scientific classification
- Kingdom: Animalia
- Phylum: Arthropoda
- Clade: Pancrustacea
- Class: Insecta
- Order: Coleoptera
- Suborder: Polyphaga
- Infraorder: Cucujiformia
- Family: Chrysomelidae
- Genus: Cryptonychus
- Species: C. interpres

Binomial name
- Cryptonychus interpres Kolbe, 1899

Species of beetle

Cryptonychus interpres is a species of beetle of the family Chrysomelidae. It is found in Cameroon and Congo.

== Life history ==
No host plant has been documented for this species.
