= Cryptonychus kolbei =

Scientific classification
- Kingdom: Animalia
- Phylum: Arthropoda
- Clade: Pancrustacea
- Class: Insecta
- Order: Coleoptera
- Suborder: Polyphaga
- Infraorder: Cucujiformia
- Family: Chrysomelidae
- Genus: Cryptonychus
- Species: C. kolbei

Binomial name
- Cryptonychus kolbei Weise, 1913

Species of beetle

Cryptonychus kolbei is a species of beetle of the family Chrysomelidae. It is found in Congo and Uganda.

== Life history ==
The recorded host plants for this species are Amomum and Aframomum species.
