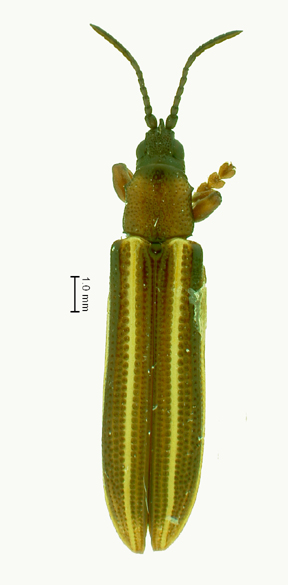

Scientific classification
- Kingdom: Animalia
- Phylum: Arthropoda
- Clade: Pancrustacea
- Class: Insecta
- Order: Coleoptera
- Suborder: Polyphaga
- Infraorder: Cucujiformia
- Family: Chrysomelidae
- Genus: Teretrispa
- Species: T. gahniae

Binomial name
- Teretrispa gahniae Gressitt, 1960

= Teretrispa gahniae =

Species of beetle

Teretrispa gahniae is a species of beetle of the family Chrysomelidae. It is found in New Caledonia.

== Description ==
Adults reach a length of about 8.6-10 mm. They are pitchy black to pale testaceous. The elytra are reddish brown, but yellowish testaceous on interspace two and the external margin in the basal half, and pitchy blackish on the suture and along a humeral stripe which becomes brownish towards the apex.

The larvae are creamy white, but pale testaceous on the head and the pronotal disc and ochraceous at the end of the abdomen.

== Life history ==
The recorded host plants for this species are Gahnia and Scleria species. The larvae bore between the bases of the leaves of their host plant. Adults feed on the under sides of leaves of the same plants.
