= Cryptonychus extremus =

Scientific classification
- Kingdom: Animalia
- Phylum: Arthropoda
- Clade: Pancrustacea
- Class: Insecta
- Order: Coleoptera
- Suborder: Polyphaga
- Infraorder: Cucujiformia
- Family: Chrysomelidae
- Genus: Cryptonychus
- Species: C. extremus

Binomial name
- Cryptonychus extremus Péringuey, 1898

Synonyms
- Cryptonychus cochlearius Kolbe, 1899; Cryptonychus congoensis Kolbe, 1899; Cryptonychus thoracicus Achard, 1917; Cryptonychus (Cryptonychus) cochlearius obscurata Uhmann 1936

Species of beetle

Cryptonychus extremus is a species of beetle of the family Chrysomelidae. It is found in Cameroon, Congo, Guinea, South Africa, Togo and Uganda.

== Life history ==
The recorded host plants for this species are Carex species, Oryza sativa, Amomum species and Aframomum species.
