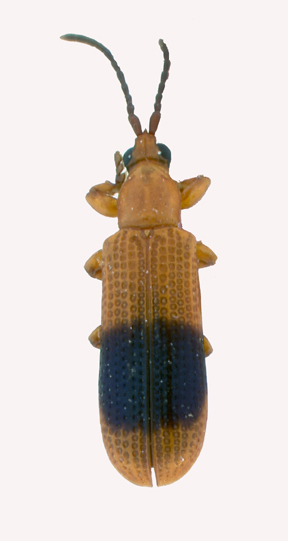

Scientific classification
- Kingdom: Animalia
- Phylum: Arthropoda
- Clade: Pancrustacea
- Class: Insecta
- Order: Coleoptera
- Suborder: Polyphaga
- Infraorder: Cucujiformia
- Family: Chrysomelidae
- Subfamily: Cassidinae
- Tribe: Cryptonychini
- Genus: Calamispa; Gressitt, 1957
- Species: C. fasciata

Binomial name
- Calamispa fasciata Gressitt, 1957

= Calamispa =

Genus of beetles

Calamispa is a genus of leaf beetles in the family Chrysomelidae. It is monotypic, being represented by the single species, Calamispa fasciata, which is found on the Solomon Islands (Guadalcanal).

== Life history ==
The recorded host plants for this species are Calamus species.
