= Stephanispa =

Scientific classification
- Kingdom: Animalia
- Phylum: Arthropoda
- Clade: Pancrustacea
- Class: Insecta
- Order: Coleoptera
- Suborder: Polyphaga
- Infraorder: Cucujiformia
- Family: Chrysomelidae
- Subfamily: Cassidinae
- Tribe: Cryptonychini
- Genus: Stephanispa; Gressitt, 1960

Genus of leaf beetles

Stephanispa is a genus of beetles belonging to the family Chrysomelidae.

== Species ==
- Stephanispa cohici Gressitt, 1960
- Stephanispa freycineticola Gressitt, 1960
