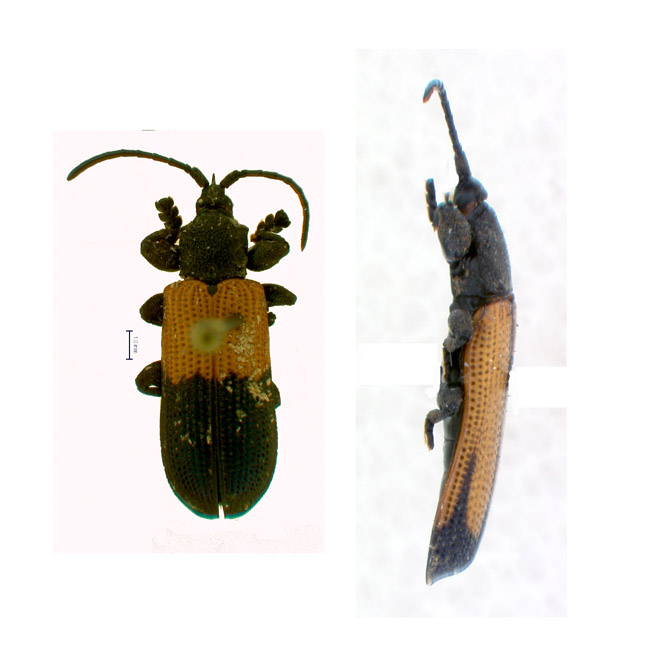

Scientific classification
- Kingdom: Animalia
- Phylum: Arthropoda
- Clade: Pancrustacea
- Class: Insecta
- Order: Coleoptera
- Suborder: Polyphaga
- Infraorder: Cucujiformia
- Family: Chrysomelidae
- Genus: Aulostyrax
- Species: A. nuciferae

Binomial name
- Aulostyrax nuciferae Maulik, 1929

Synonyms
- Xiphispa incerta Uhmann, 1930

= Aulostyrax nuciferae =

Species of beetle

Aulostyrax nuciferae is a species of beetle of the family Chrysomelidae. It is found on the Solomon Islands.

== Life history ==
The recorded host plants for subspecies nuciferae are Cocos nucifera and Pinanga species. All life stages occur between the petiole-bases and main stems of the host plant. The larvae burrow in the inner surface of the petiole-bases, while the adults feed on undersurfaces of fronds. Subspecies incerta has been recorded on Metroxylon species.

== Subspecies ==
- Aulostyrax nuciferae nuciferae (Solomon Islands: Malaita)
- Aulostyrax nuciferae incerta (Uhmann, 1930) (Solomon Islands: Bougainville)
