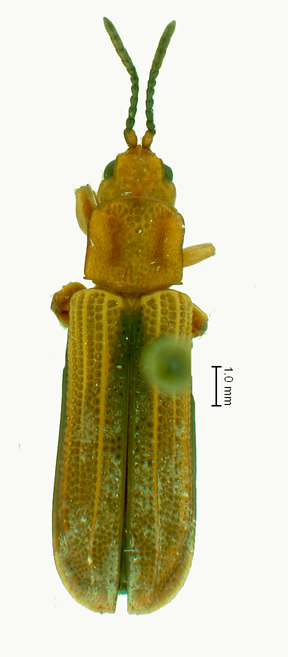

Scientific classification
- Kingdom: Animalia
- Phylum: Arthropoda
- Clade: Pancrustacea
- Class: Insecta
- Order: Coleoptera
- Suborder: Polyphaga
- Infraorder: Cucujiformia
- Family: Chrysomelidae
- Genus: Stephanispa
- Species: S. freycineticola

Binomial name
- Stephanispa freycineticola Gressitt, 1960

= Stephanispa freycineticola =

Species of beetle

Stephanispa freycineticola is a species of beetle of the family Chrysomelidae. It is found in New Caledonia.

== Description ==
Adults reach a length of about 8.2-8.6 mm. They are orange testaceous to black. The head is pale and the antennae are mostly black with some orange and reddish. The prothorax are pale testaceous and the elytra are testaceous on the basal one-fourth, while the rest is pitchy black to dull brown.

The larvae are pale testaceous, but almost colourless on the last two lateral abdominal processes and pitchy brown on the caudal process.

== Life history ==
The recorded host plants for this species are Freycinetia, but also Pandanaceae species. All life stages occur in the terminal crowns of their host plant, where both the larvae and adults feed on the bases of the new leaves.
