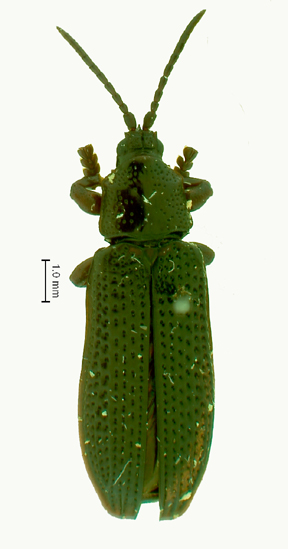

Scientific classification
- Kingdom: Animalia
- Phylum: Arthropoda
- Clade: Pancrustacea
- Class: Insecta
- Order: Coleoptera
- Suborder: Polyphaga
- Infraorder: Cucujiformia
- Family: Chrysomelidae
- Genus: Isopedhispa
- Species: I. cocotis

Binomial name
- Isopedhispa cocotis (Maulik, 1933)

Synonyms
- Plesispa cocotis Maulik, 1933

= Isopedhispa cocotis =

Species of beetle

Isopedhispa cocotis is a species of beetle of the family Chrysomelidae. It is found in New Caledonia.

== Life history ==
The recorded host plant for this species is Cocos nucifera.
