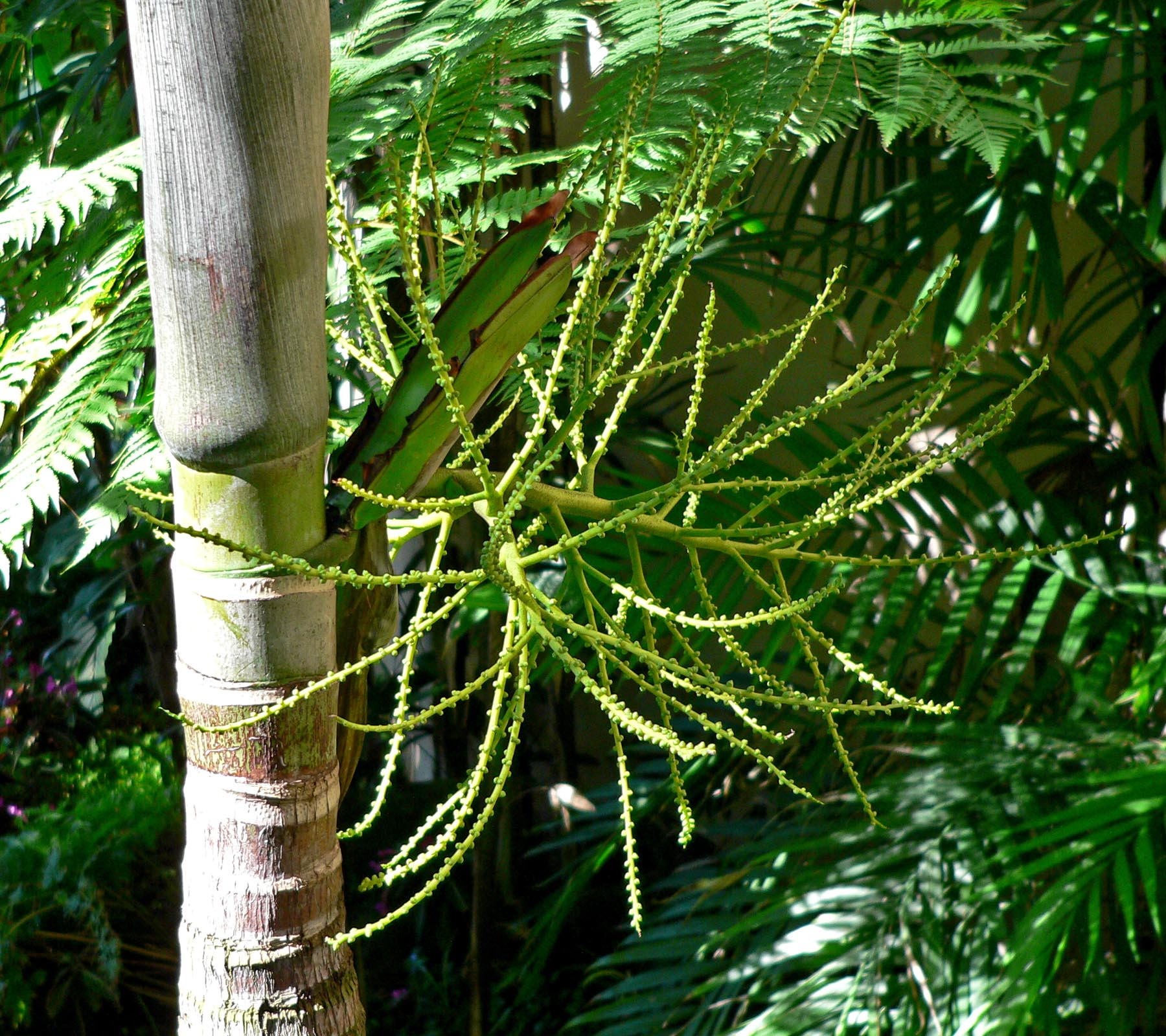
- Ptychosperma elegans

Scientific classification
- Kingdom: Plantae
- Clade: Tracheophytes
- Clade: Angiosperms
- Clade: Monocots
- Clade: Commelinids
- Order: Arecales
- Family: Arecaceae
- Subfamily: Arecoideae
- Tribe: Areceae
- Subtribe: Ptychospermatinae
- Genus: Ptychosperma; Labill.

Synonyms
- Seaforthia R.Br.; Actinophloeus (Becc.) Becc.; Romanowia Sander ex André; Strongylocaryum Burret

= Ptychosperma =

Genus of palms

Ptychosperma is a genus of flowering plant in the family Arecaceae. Most are native to Australia and/or New Guinea, with a few in the Solomon Islands and in Maluku Province of eastern Indonesia. Some have been cultivated abroad as house or garden plants, and reportedly naturalized in certain regions (Caribbean, Polynesia, Fiji, Florida, Australia, New Guinea)

== Species ==
It contains the following species:

- Ptychosperma ambiguum (Becc.) Becc. ex Martelli – western New Guinea
- Ptychosperma buabe Essig – Papua New Guinea
- Ptychosperma burretianum Essig – D'Entrecasteaux Islands
- Ptychosperma caryotoides Ridl. – Papua New Guinea
- Ptychosperma cuneatum (Burret) Burret – New Guinea
- Ptychosperma elegans (R.Br.) Blume – Queensland; naturalized in Florida, Polynesia, Dominican Republic
- Ptychosperma furcatum (Becc.) Becc. ex Martelli – Papua New Guinea
- Ptychosperma gracile Labill. – Bismarck Archipelago
- Ptychosperma halmaherense Heatubun – Maluku → Jailoloa halmaherensis
- Ptychosperma hartmannii Becc. – New Guinea
- Ptychosperma lauterbachii Becc. – Papua New Guinea
- Ptychosperma lineare (Burret) Burret – Papua New Guinea
- Ptychosperma macarthurii (H.Wendl. ex H.J.Veitch) H.Wendl. ex Hook.f. – New Guinea, Queensland, Northern Territory
- Ptychosperma macrocerum Becc. – New Guinea
- Ptychosperma mambare (F.M.Bailey) Becc. ex Martelli – Papua New Guinea
- Ptychosperma microcarpum (Burret) Burret – Papua New Guinea
- Ptychosperma mooreanum Essig – New Guinea
- Ptychosperma nicolai (Sander ex André) Burret – New Guinea
- Ptychosperma praemorsum Becc. – New Guinea
- Ptychosperma propinquum (Becc.) Becc. ex Martelli – Aru Islands, Salawati Island, Kai Islands
- Ptychosperma pullenii Essig – Papua New Guinea
- Ptychosperma ramosissimum Essig – Louisiade Archipelago
- Ptychosperma rosselense Essig – Papua New Guinea
- Ptychosperma salomonense Burret – Papua New Guinea, Solomon Islands
- Ptychosperma sanderianum Ridl. – Papua New Guinea
- Ptychosperma schefferi Becc. ex Martelli – New Guinea
- Ptychosperma streimannii Essig – Papua New Guinea
- Ptychosperma tagulense Essig – Louisiade Archipelago
- Ptychosperma vestitum Essig – Papua New Guinea
- Ptychosperma waitianum Essig – Papua New Guinea
