= List of Freycinetia species =

Freycinetia is a genus of flowering plants in the family Pandanaceae. As of November 2025, Plants of the World Online accepts the following 303 species:

== A-B ==
- Freycinetia abbreviata Markgr.
- Freycinetia acicularis Huynh
- Freycinetia aculeata Sinaga
- Freycinetia acuta Huynh
- Freycinetia acutifolia Merr.
- Freycinetia admiraltiensis Huynh
- Freycinetia allantoidea A.P.Keim
- Freycinetia amoena Huynh
- Freycinetia ancistrosperma Huynh
- Freycinetia andajensis Martelli
- Freycinetia angakumiana Huynh
- Freycinetia angulata C.B.Rob. ex Martelli
- Freycinetia angusta Huynh
- Freycinetia angustifolia Blume
- Freycinetia angustissima Ridl.
- Freycinetia apayaoensis Merr.
- Freycinetia apoensis Martelli
- Freycinetia arborea Gaudich.
- Freycinetia archboldiana Merr. & L.M.Perry
- Freycinetia arfakiana Martelli
- Freycinetia aruensis Martelli
- Freycinetia atocensis Martelli
- Freycinetia awaiarensis Huynh
- Freycinetia backeri B.C.Stone
- Freycinetia banksii A.Cunn.
- Freycinetia bassa Huynh
- Freycinetia baueriana Endl.
- Freycinetia beccarii Solms
- Freycinetia berbakensis Widjaja, Pasaribu & Hidayat
- Freycinetia bicolor B.C.Stone
- Freycinetia biloba B.C.Stone
- Freycinetia bismarckensis Huynh
- Freycinetia boluboluensis Huynh
- Freycinetia bomberaiensis Huynh
- Freycinetia borneensis Martelli
- Freycinetia bosaviensis Huynh
- Freycinetia brachyclada Huynh
- Freycinetia brassii Merr. & L.M.Perry
- Freycinetia breviauriculata Huynh
- Freycinetia brevifolia Martelli
- Freycinetia brevipedunculata Huynh
- Freycinetia brevis Huynh
- Freycinetia bulusanensis Merr.

== C-E ==
- Freycinetia carnosa Huynh
- Freycinetia caudata Hemsl.
- Freycinetia celebica Solms
- Freycinetia chartacea Huynh
- Freycinetia ciliaris Martelli
- Freycinetia circuita Sinaga, A.P.Keim & Purady.
- Freycinetia coagmentata Huynh
- Freycinetia cochleatisperma Huynh
- Freycinetia comptonii Rendle
- Freycinetia concinna Martelli
- Freycinetia concolor Huynh
- Freycinetia confusa Ridl.
- Freycinetia corneri B.C.Stone
- Freycinetia craterensis Huynh
- Freycinetia creaghi Hemsl.
- Freycinetia crucigera Kaneh.
- Freycinetia cultella B.C.Stone
- Freycinetia cumingiana Gaudich.
- Freycinetia curranii Merr.
- Freycinetia curvata Huynh
- Freycinetia daymanensis Huynh
- Freycinetia decipiens Merr. & L.M.Perry
- Freycinetia demissa Benn.
- Freycinetia devriesei Solms
- Freycinetia dewildeorum Pasaribu
- Freycinetia dilatata Merr. ex Elmer
- Freycinetia discoidea Martelli
- Freycinetia dissita Huynh
- Freycinetia distigmata B.C.Stone
- Freycinetia divaricata Merr. & L.M.Perry
- Freycinetia dubia Martelli
- Freycinetia elegantula B.C.Stone
- Freycinetia ellipticifolia Huynh
- Freycinetia ensifolia Merr.
- Freycinetia erythrophylla Huynh
- Freycinetia erythrospatha Merr. & L.M.Perry
- Freycinetia erythrostigma Solms ex Martelli
- Freycinetia excelsa F.Muell.

== F-J ==
- Freycinetia falcata Huynh
- Freycinetia fergussonensis Huynh
- Freycinetia ferox Warb.
- Freycinetia fibrosa Martelli
- Freycinetia filifolia Huynh
- Freycinetia filiformis Huynh
- Freycinetia flaviceps Rendle
- Freycinetia forbesii Ridl.
- Freycinetia formosana Hemsl.
- Freycinetia formosula Huynh
- Freycinetia frutaspiralica Sinaga, A.P.Keim & Purady.
- Freycinetia frutonumerata Sinaga, A.P.Keim & Purady.
- Freycinetia funicularis (Savigny) Merr.
- Freycinetia fusifolia Huynh
- Freycinetia fusiforma Sinaga, A.P.Keim & Purady.
- Freycinetia fusiformis B.C.Stone
- Freycinetia gibbsiae Rendle
- Freycinetia gitingiana Martelli
- Freycinetia glaucescens Huynh
- Freycinetia glaucifolia Huynh
- Freycinetia glomerosa Huynh
- Freycinetia goodenoughensis Huynh
- Freycinetia graminea Blume
- Freycinetia graminifolia Solms
- Freycinetia granulata Huynh
- Freycinetia grayana L.M.Perry
- Freycinetia gunungmejensis Sinaga
- Freycinetia hagenicola Huynh
- Freycinetia halmaherensis A.P.Keim, W.Sujarwo & Sahroni
- Freycinetia hemsleyi Warb.
- Freycinetia herzogensis Huynh
- Freycinetia hombronii Martelli
- Freycinetia humilis Hemsl.
- Freycinetia hydra B.C.Stone
- Freycinetia imbricata Blume
- Freycinetia imbristigma Sinaga, A.P.Keim & Purady.
- Freycinetia impudens B.C.Stone
- Freycinetia inermis Ridl.
- Freycinetia insignis Blume
- Freycinetia insolita B.C.Stone
- Freycinetia insueta Huynh
- Freycinetia insulana Huynh
- Freycinetia jagorii Warb.
- Freycinetia jaheriana Martelli
- Freycinetia javanica Blume

== K-L ==
- Freycinetia kalimantanica B.C.Stone
- Freycinetia kamialiensis Huynh
- Freycinetia kamiana B.C.Stone
- Freycinetia kanehirae B.C.Stone
- Freycinetia kartawinatae A.P.Keim
- Freycinetia kaugelensis Huynh
- Freycinetia keyensis Martelli
- Freycinetia kinabaluana B.C.Stone
- Freycinetia klossii Ridl.
- Freycinetia koordersiana Martelli
- Freycinetia kopiagoensis Huynh
- Freycinetia kostermansii B.C.Stone
- Freycinetia kuborensis Huynh
- Freycinetia kutubuana Huynh
- Freycinetia kwerbaensis A.P.Keim
- Freycinetia lacinulata Kaneh.
- Freycinetia laeta Merr. & L.M.Perry
- Freycinetia lagenicarpa Warb.
- Freycinetia lalokiensis Huynh
- Freycinetia lanceolata Huynh
- Freycinetia lateriflora Ridl.
- Freycinetia latiauriculata Kaneh.
- Freycinetia latibracteata Merr. & L.M.Perry
- Freycinetia lenifolia Huynh
- Freycinetia lepida Huynh
- Freycinetia leptophylla Martelli
- Freycinetia leptostachya B.C.Stone
- Freycinetia leuserensis Pasaribu
- Freycinetia linearifolia Merr. & L.M.Perry
- Freycinetia linearis Merr. & L.M.Perry
- Freycinetia lombokensis Markgr.
- Freycinetia longifolia Huynh
- Freycinetia longiramulosa Huynh
- Freycinetia lorifolia Martelli
- Freycinetia louisiadensis Huynh
- Freycinetia lucbanensis Elmer
- Freycinetia lunata Huynh

== M-O ==
- Freycinetia macrostachya Martelli
- Freycinetia madangensis Huynh
- Freycinetia magnoareola Sinaga, A.P.Keim & Purady.
- Freycinetia manusensis Huynh
- Freycinetia marantifolia Hemsl.
- Freycinetia marginata Blume
- Freycinetia mediana Huynh
- Freycinetia megacarpa Merr.
- Freycinetia membranacea Merr. & L.M.Perry
- Freycinetia merrillii Elmer
- Freycinetia microdonta Martelli
- Freycinetia micrura B.C.Stone
- Freycinetia minahassae Koord.
- Freycinetia misimica Huynh
- Freycinetia modica Huynh
- Freycinetia monocephala Elmer
- Freycinetia monticola Rendle
- Freycinetia moratii Huynh
- Freycinetia morobeensis Huynh
- Freycinetia multiflora Merr.
- Freycinetia nakanaiensis Huynh
- Freycinetia negrosensis Merr.
- Freycinetia neoforbesii Huynh
- Freycinetia neoglaucescens Huynh
- Freycinetia nesiotica Merr. & L.M.Perry
- Freycinetia nonatoae A.P.Keim & C.C.Tan
- Freycinetia normanbyensis Huynh
- Freycinetia novobritannica Huynh
- Freycinetia novocaledonica Warb.
- Freycinetia novohibernica Lauterb.
- Freycinetia novopomeranica Martelli
- Freycinetia oblanceolata Martelli
- Freycinetia oblonga Huynh
- Freycinetia oblongifolia Merr.
- Freycinetia obtusiacuminata Huynh
- Freycinetia oraria Huynh
- Freycinetia oreophila Merr. & L.M.Perry

== P-R ==
- Freycinetia palawanensis Elmer
- Freycinetia pallida Huynh
- Freycinetia panica Huynh
- Freycinetia parviaculeata B.C.Stone
- Freycinetia pauperata Huynh
- Freycinetia pectinata Merr. & L.M.Perry
- Freycinetia percostata Merr. & L.M.Perry
- Freycinetia peripiezocarpa Martelli
- Freycinetia perryana B.C.Stone
- Freycinetia petiolacea Merr. & L.M.Perry
- Freycinetia philippinensis Hemsl.
- Freycinetia pinifolia Huynh
- Freycinetia plana Huynh
- Freycinetia pleurantha Merr. & L.M.Perry
- Freycinetia pluvisilvatica Huynh
- Freycinetia polystachya Martelli
- Freycinetia polystigma Warb.
- Freycinetia pritchardii Seem.
- Freycinetia pseudoangustissima Huynh
- Freycinetia pseudograminifolia Huynh
- Freycinetia pseudohombronii Huynh
- Freycinetia pseudoinsignis Warb.
- Freycinetia pseudopetiolata A.P.Keim, Kuswata & W.Sujarwo
- Freycinetia pycnophylla Solms
- Freycinetia quezonensis A.P.Keim, M.G.Nonato, C.C.Tan & W.Sujarwo
- Freycinetia radicans Gaudich.
- Freycinetia rectangularis Kaneh.
- Freycinetia regina B.C.Stone
- Freycinetia reineckei Warb.
- Freycinetia relegata Huynh
- Freycinetia revoluta Huynh
- Freycinetia rhodospatha Ridl.
- Freycinetia rigida Elmer
- Freycinetia rigidifolia Hemsl.
- Freycinetia robinsonii Merr.
- Freycinetia rossellana Huynh
- Freycinetia rubripedata Huynh
- Freycinetia runcingensis A.P.Keim

== S ==
- Freycinetia sachsenensis Huynh
- Freycinetia salamauensis Merr. & L.M.Perry
- Freycinetia santacruzensis Huynh
- Freycinetia sarasinorum Warb.
- Freycinetia sarawakensis Martelli
- Freycinetia scabrida Huynh
- Freycinetia scabripes Warb.
- Freycinetia scabrosa Pasaribu & Widjaja
- Freycinetia scandens Gaudich.
- Freycinetia schlechteri Warb.
- Freycinetia schraderensis Huynh
- Freycinetia scitula Huynh
- Freycinetia sclerophylla Huynh
- Freycinetia sepikensis Huynh
- Freycinetia setosa Huynh
- Freycinetia silvatica Huynh
- Freycinetia simulatrix B.C.Stone
- Freycinetia sogerensis Rendle
- Freycinetia solomonensis B.C.Stone
- Freycinetia spectabilis Solms
- Freycinetia sphaerocephala Gaudich.
- Freycinetia spinellosa Kaneh.
- Freycinetia spinifera A.P.Keim
- Freycinetia spiralis Kaneh.
- Freycinetia starensis Huynh
- Freycinetia stenodonta Merr. & L.M.Perry
- Freycinetia sterrophylla Merr. & L.M.Perry
- Freycinetia stonei Huynh
- Freycinetia storckii Seem.
- Freycinetia streimannii A.P.Keim
- Freycinetia stricta B.C.Stone
- Freycinetia subracemosa A.P.Keim
- Freycinetia sulcata Warb.
- Freycinetia sumatrana Hemsl.
- Freycinetia sumbawaensis A.P.Keim & M.Rahayu

== T-Z ==
- Freycinetia tafaensis Merr. & L.M.Perry
- Freycinetia takeuchii Huynh
- Freycinetia tarali Huynh
- Freycinetia tawadana Kimura
- Freycinetia tenella Huynh
- Freycinetia tenuifolia Huynh
- Freycinetia tenuis Solms
- Freycinetia tidorensis A.P.Keim
- Freycinetia timorensis Martelli
- Freycinetia trachypoda Merr. & L.M.Perry
- Freycinetia ultrapedicellata Sinaga, A.P.Keim & Purady.
- Freycinetia undulata Merr. & L.M.Perry
- Freycinetia urvilleana Hombr. & Jacquinot ex Decne.
- Freycinetia verruculosa Warb.
- Freycinetia vidalii Hemsl.
- Freycinetia vieillardii Martelli
- Freycinetia villalobosiana Martelli
- Freycinetia viriosa Huynh
- Freycinetia vitiensis Seem.
- Freycinetia vulgaris Merr. & L.M.Perry
- Freycinetia walkeri Solms
- Freycinetia wamenaensis A.P.Keim
- Freycinetia warburgii Elmer
- Freycinetia webbiana Gaudich.
- Freycinetia whitmorei B.C.Stone
- Freycinetia wiharjae A.P.Keim, Witono & W.Sujarwo
- Freycinetia wilderi Martelli ex Wilder
- Freycinetia williamsii Merr.
- Freycinetia winkleriana Martelli
- Freycinetia woodlarkensis Huynh
