= Martellidendron karaka =

Scientific classification
- Kingdom: Plantae
- Clade: Tracheophytes
- Clade: Angiosperms
- Clade: Monocots
- Order: Pandanales
- Family: Pandanaceae
- Genus: Martellidendron
- Species: M. karaka

Binomial name
- Martellidendron karaka (Martelli) Callm.

Synonyms
- List: Martellidendron masoalense (Laivao & Callm.) Callm. & Chassot; Pandanus karaka Martelli; Pandanus masoalensis Laivao & Callm.; Pandanus nosibicus Huynh

Species of flowering plant

Martellidendron karaka is a species of plant in the family Pandanaceae, endemic to Madagascar.
