= Pandanus calcicola =

Scientific classification
- Kingdom: Plantae
- Clade: Tracheophytes
- Clade: Angiosperms
- Clade: Monocots
- Order: Pandanales
- Family: Pandanaceae
- Genus: Pandanus
- Species: P. calcicola

Binomial name
- Pandanus calcicola Holttum & H.St.John

Species of flowering plant

Pandanus calcicola a species of plant in the family Pandanaceae native to Peninsular Malaysia. Its stems are about one meter tall, while the thick, leathery leaves can be up to 4 meters long. The leaves are slightly paler on the underside and feature reticulate venation. Terminal, spike inflorescences with long peduncles give way to drupes.
