= Cyperus penzoanus =

Scientific classification
- Kingdom: Plantae
- Clade: Tracheophytes
- Clade: Angiosperms
- Clade: Monocots
- Clade: Commelinids
- Order: Poales
- Family: Cyperaceae
- Genus: Cyperus
- Species: C. penzoanus

Binomial name
- Cyperus penzoanus Pic.Serm. 1951

Species of sedge

Cyperus penzoanus is a species of sedge that is native to parts of Africa, specifically Equatorial Guinea, Ethiopia, Kenya, Tanzania, and Uganda. It is a perennial and grows primarily in the seasonally dry tropical biome.

== See also ==
- List of Cyperus species
