= Martellidendron androcephalanthos =

Conservation status
- Vulnerable (IUCN 3.1)

Scientific classification
- Kingdom: Plantae
- Clade: Tracheophytes
- Clade: Angiosperms
- Clade: Monocots
- Order: Pandanales
- Family: Pandanaceae
- Genus: Martellidendron
- Species: M. androcephalanthos

Binomial name
- Martellidendron androcephalanthos (Martelli) Callm. & Chassot

Species of flowering plant

Martellidendron androcephalanthos is a species of tree in the Martellidendron genus. It is native to Madagascar. It is on the IUCN Red List of Threatened Species and is considered vulnerable.
