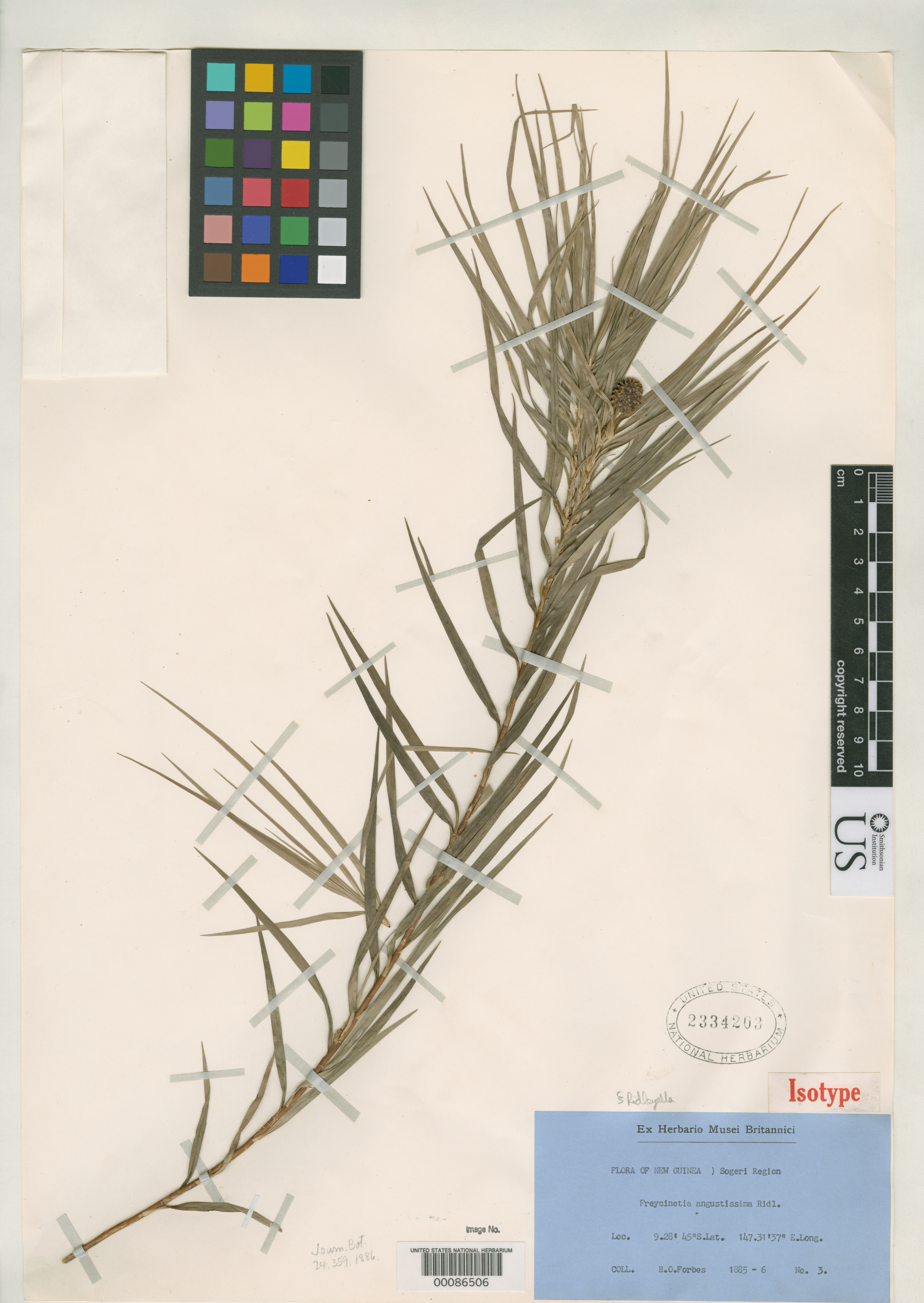
- Image of herbarium sample of Freycinetia angustissima

Scientific classification
- Kingdom: Plantae
- Clade: Tracheophytes
- Clade: Angiosperms
- Clade: Monocots
- Order: Pandanales
- Family: Pandanaceae
- Genus: Freycinetia
- Species: F. angustissima

Binomial name
- Freycinetia angustissima Ridl.

= Freycinetia angustissima =

Species of plant

Freycinetia angustissima is a species of plant in the family Pandanaceae. It is endemic to New Guinea.
