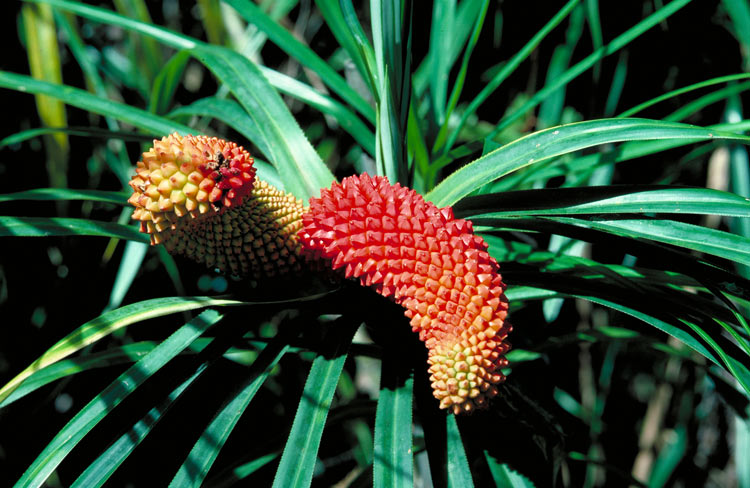
- Ripening fruit

Conservation status
- Vulnerable (NCA)

Scientific classification
- Kingdom: Plantae
- Clade: Tracheophytes
- Clade: Angiosperms
- Clade: Monocots
- Order: Pandanales
- Family: Pandanaceae
- Genus: Freycinetia
- Species: F. percostata

Binomial name
- Freycinetia percostata Merr. & L.M.Perry

= Freycinetia percostata =

Climbing pandan

Species of flowering plant

Freycinetia percostata, commonly known as climbing pandan, is a plant in the family Pandanaceae native to New Guinea, the Solomon Islands and the Northern Territory and Queensland in Australia. It is a root climber with stems up to a maximum of 3 cm (1.2 in) diameter. Leaves are long and narrow with parallel venation, and are arranged in closely packed spirals. Auricles are present at the leaf base and the margins are finely toothed. The species is dioecious, meaning that pistillate (functionally female) and staminate (functionally male) flowers are borne on separate plants. Inflorescences consist of spadices and are surrounded by orange bracts. Fruit are a multiple fruit consisting of numerous red berries about 1 cm (0.39 in) wide.

== Conservation ==
This species is listed as vulnerable under the Queensland Government's Nature Conservation Act.
