= Ugolino Martelli =

Italian botanist, biologist, and mycologist

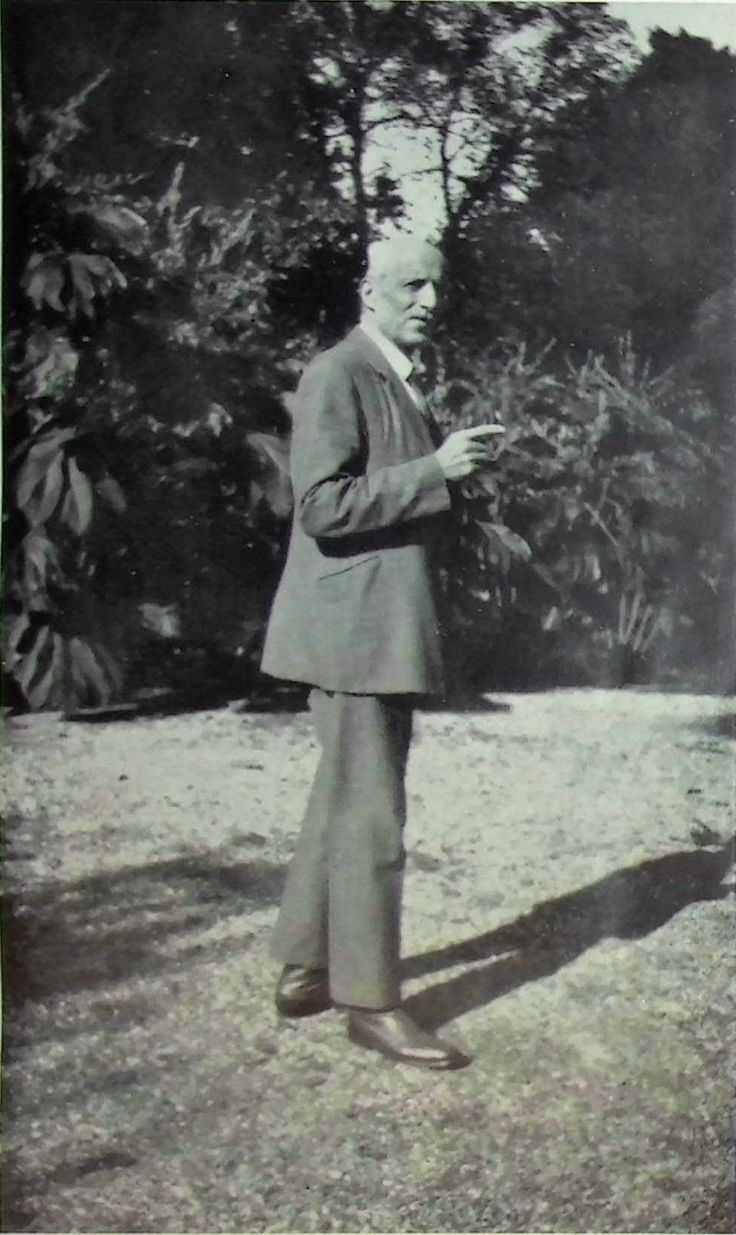
- Born: 1860
- Died: 1934 (aged 73–74)
- Known for: Martelli's cat
- Scientific career
- Fields: Biology, Botany
- Author abbrev. (botany): Martelli

Ugolino Martelli (1860–1934) was an Italian botanist, biologist, and mycologist. Martelli is known for his studies of and contributions to the systematics of the tropical genus Pandanus and his taxonomic definition of the flora of Sardinia. He also specialized in studies of the flora of Tuscany and Malaysia.

Martelli's biological research led to the discovery of Felis lunensis (Martelli's Cat), an extinct felid of the subfamily Felinae. The holotype specimen was first described by Martelli in 1906 and is now preserved in the collections of the University of Florence in Italy.

His student Odoardo Beccari, used Martelli's herbarium for his own research on the definition of the monocot genus Pandanus.

Martelli was the director of the Botanical Garden of Pisa from 1929 to 1930.

In 1905 in Florence, Martelli founded the Webbia Journal of Plant Taxonomy and Geography. Martelli named the journal in honor of Philip Barker Webb (1793–1854), a friend of Filippo Parlatore.

The genus Martellidendron in the family Pandanaceae, previously recognized as a section of the genus Pandanus, was separated in 2003 on the basis of phylogenetic studies that used chloroplast DNA sequence data. The genus was originally named by Rodolfo Emilio Giuseppe Pichi-Sermolli in Martelli's honour.

== Taxa ==
Some taxa authored in Acanthaceae:
Blepharis hirta Martelli—Fl. Bogos. (1886) 65. (now Blepharis linariifolia Pers.)
Calophanes fasciculiflora Martelli—Nuovo Giorn. Bot. Ital. xx. (1888) (now Dyschoriste nagchana (Nees) Bennet
Hygrophila coerulea Martelli—Nuovo Giorn. Bot. Ital. xx. 390. 1888 ((currently unresolved)
Hypoestes tenuispica Delile ex Martelli—Nuovo Giorn. Bot. Ital. xx. (1888) 395 (now synonymous with Hypoestes forskaolii subsp. forskaolii).
Justicia aethiopica Martelli -- Nuovo Giorn. Bot. Ital. xx. (1888) 393. (now Justicia matammensis (Schweinf.) Oliv.)
Justicia variegata Martelli—Nuovo Giorn. Bot. Ital. xx. (1888) 393.

Portions of this article were translated from the corresponding article in the Spanish Wikipedia.
