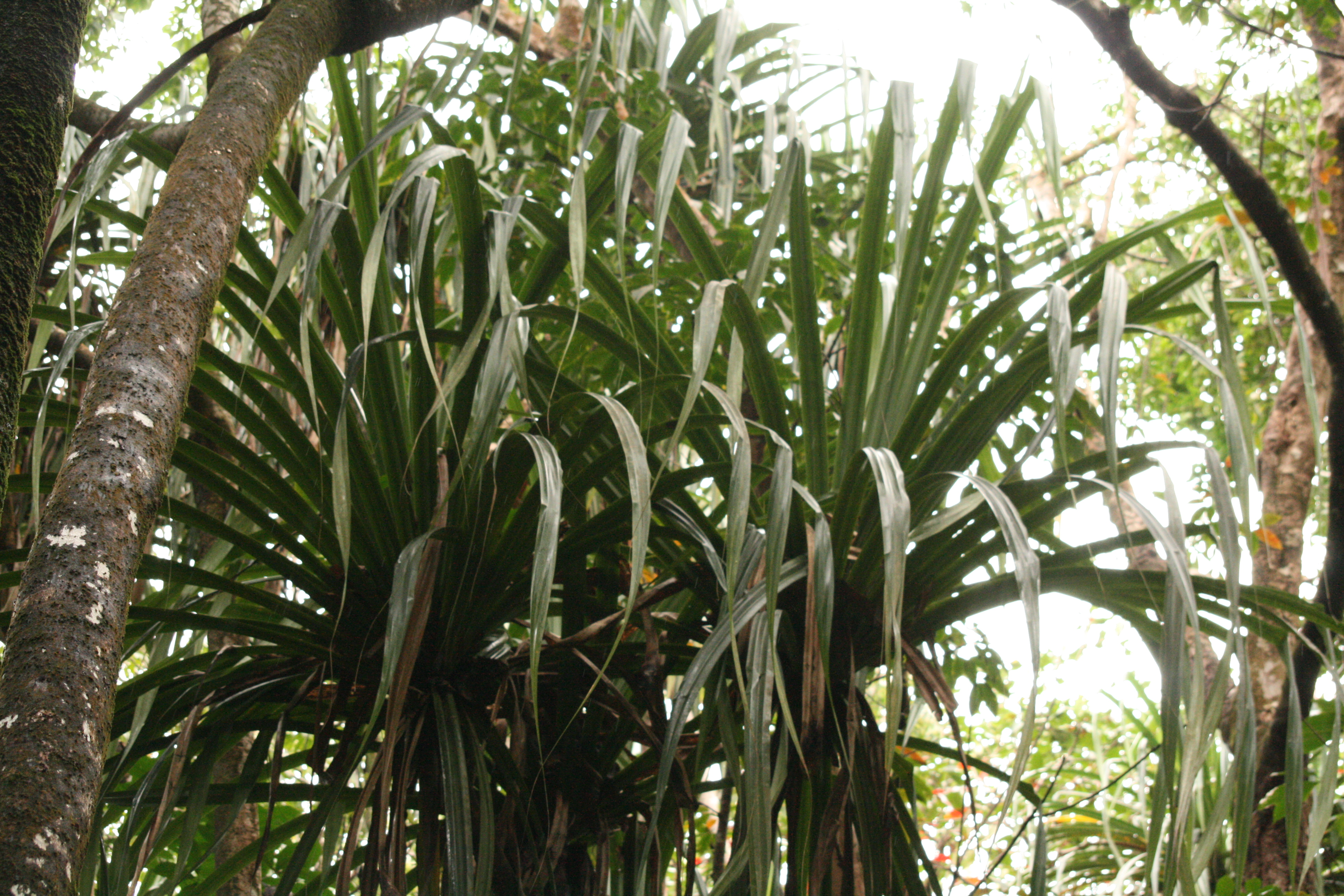

Scientific classification
- Kingdom: Plantae
- Clade: Tracheophytes
- Clade: Angiosperms
- Clade: Monocots
- Order: Pandanales
- Family: Pandanaceae
- Genus: Martellidendron (Pic.Serm.) Callm. & Chassot

Species
- See text

= Martellidendron =

Genus of flowering plants

Martellidendron is a genus of flowering plants in the family Pandanaceae, native to the Seychelles and Madagascar. They bear a slight resemblance to palms, but are not closely related to them. Martellidendron was previously recognized as a section of the genus Pandanus in 1951 by Rodolfo Emilio Giuseppe Pichi-Sermolli, then as a subgenus in 1974. It was finally promoted to generic status in 2003 on the basis of phylogenetic studies that used chloroplast DNA sequence data.

The genus name of Martellidendron is in honour of Ugolino Martelli (1860–1934), who was an Italian botanist, biologist, and mycologist, plus dendron the Greek word for "tree".

The genus was circumscribed by Martin Wilhelm Callmander and Philippe Chassot in Taxon vol.52 (Issue 4) on page 755-762 in 2003.

== Morphology ==
Martellidendron plants are dioecious, that is, the male and female flowers are on separate plants. The male flowers have many stamens (as many as 100), and grow in an inflorescence that consists of spikes surrounded by bracts. As the female flowers mature, they merge into an oblong or spherical multiple fruit. An individual fruit is a drupe with two chambers.

== Species ==
Martellidendron comprises six species;

- Martellidendron androcephalanthos (Martelli) Callm. & Chassot
- Martellidendron cruciatum (Pic.Serm.) Callm. & Chassot
- Martellidendron gallinarum (Callm.) Callm.
- Martellidendron hornei (Balf.f.) Callm. & Chassot
- Martellidendron karaka (Martelli) Callm.
- Martellidendron kariangense (Huynh) Callm.
