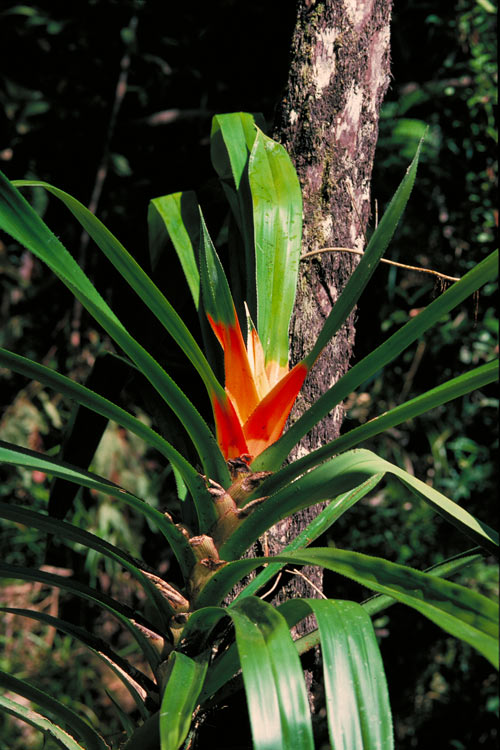

Conservation status
- Vulnerable (NCA)

Scientific classification
- Kingdom: Plantae
- Clade: Tracheophytes
- Clade: Angiosperms
- Clade: Monocots
- Order: Pandanales
- Family: Pandanaceae
- Genus: Freycinetia
- Species: F. marginata

Binomial name
- Freycinetia marginata Blume

Synonyms
- Freycinetia australiensis Warb.; Freycinetia carolana F.Muell.; Freycinetia tessellata Merr. & L.M.Perry

= Freycinetia marginata =

Giant climbing pandan

Species of flowering plant

Freycinetia marginata, commonly known as giant climbing pandan, is a climbing plant in the family Pandanaceae. It is native to New Guinea and Queensland, Australia.

== Description ==
Freycinetia marginata is an evergreen root climber with a stem diameter of up to 3 cm (1.2 in), which is held tightly to its support substrate by numerous adventitious roots. The leaves have fine longitudinal veins and are green with a purplish hue. They are long and strap like, measuring up to 150 cm (59 in) long by 8 cm (3.1 in) wide, and the margins (edges) may have small spines or teeth. The leaf bases are expanded laterally to form ligules, that is, thin membranous extensions of the leaf blade which overlap with neighbouring ligules, creating traps for water and biotic debris.

== Taxonomy ==
This species was described by the German-Dutch botanist Carl Ludwig Blume, who spent much time working on the flora of the Dutch East Indies (now Indonesia). His description was based on material provided by the Dutch collector Alexander Zippelius, and was published in his book Rumphia in 1837.

== Distribution and habitat ==
The giant climbing pandan grows in rainforest at altitudes from sea level to around 200 m (660 ft), often in gullies near rivers and streams. The range extends from Queensland, Australia, to New Guinea. In Australia it is found in two disjunct populations – one in the vicinity of Lockhart River in northern Cape York and the other in the valleys of the Daintree River and its tributaries.

== Conservation ==
This species is listed by the Queensland Department of Environment and Science as vulnerable. As of 27 April 2023, it has not been assessed by the International Union for Conservation of Nature (IUCN).

== Gallery ==
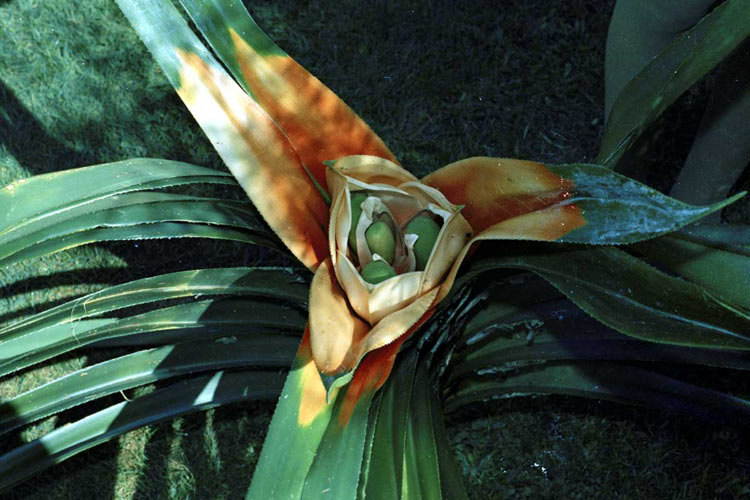

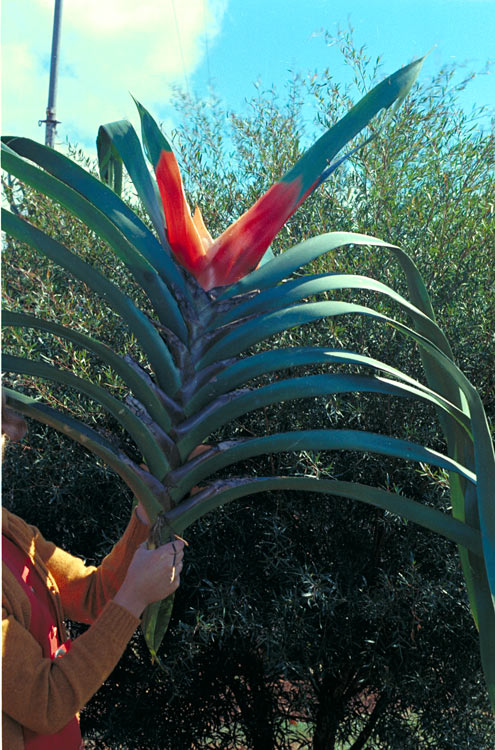

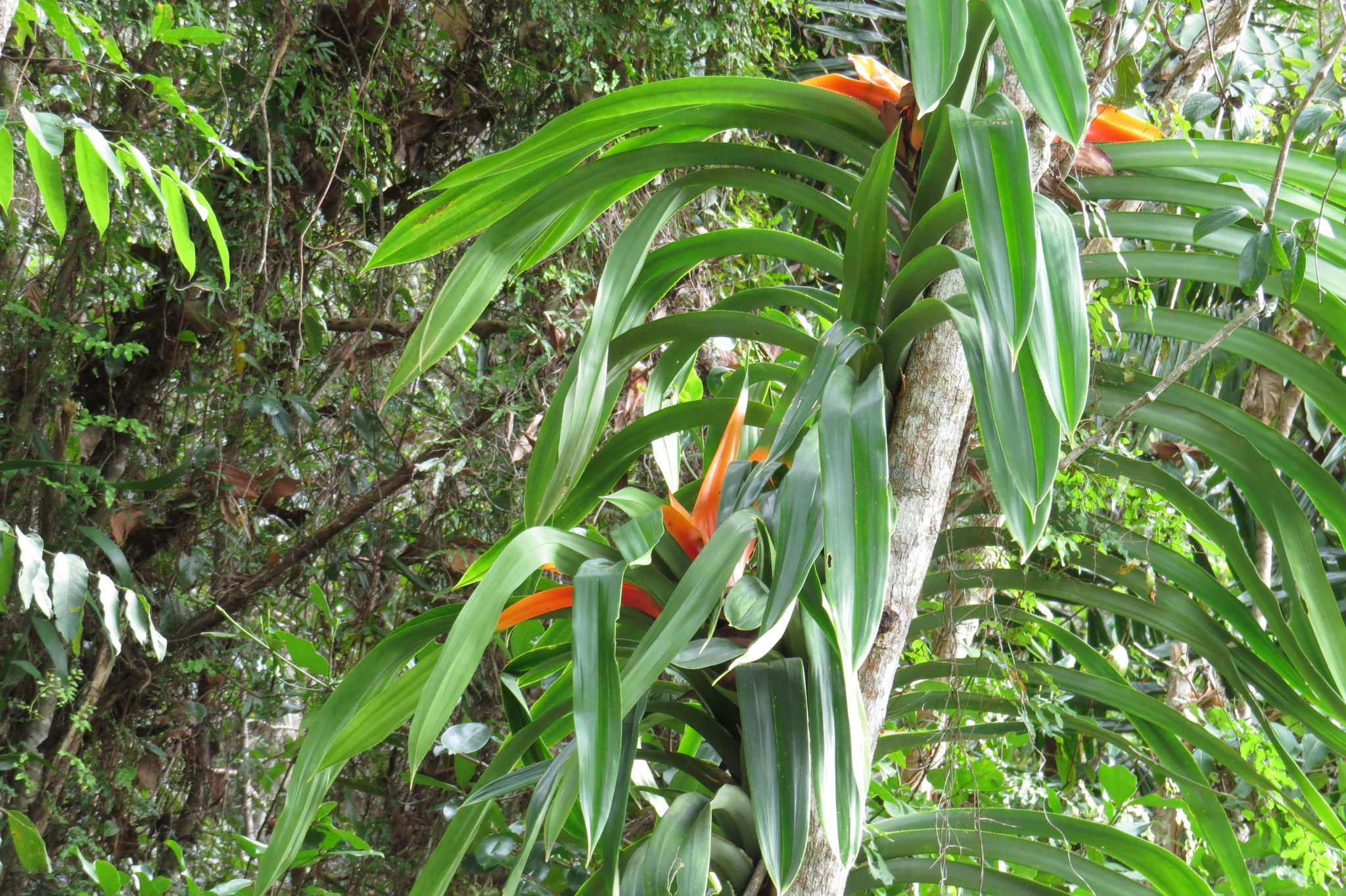
