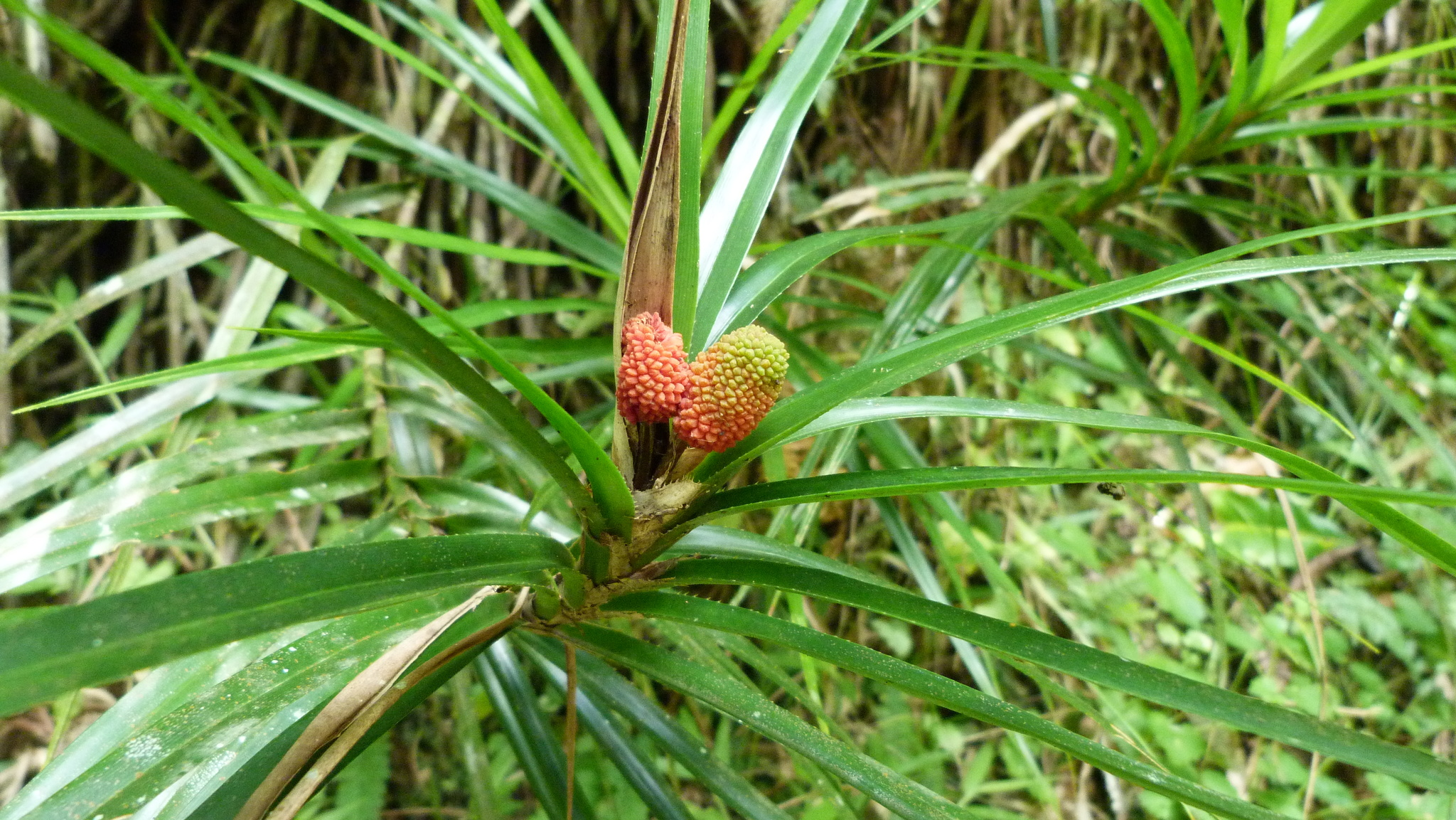
- Foliage and ripe fruit

Scientific classification
- Kingdom: Plantae
- Clade: Tracheophytes
- Clade: Angiosperms
- Clade: Monocots
- Order: Pandanales
- Family: Pandanaceae
- Genus: Freycinetia
- Species: F. excelsa

Binomial name
- Freycinetia excelsa F.Muell.

= Freycinetia excelsa =

Giant climbing pandan

Species of flowering plant

Freycinetia excelsa is a species of climbing plant in the family Pandanaceae. Naturally found growing in northern and eastern Australia, as far south as the Tweed Valley in New South Wales.
