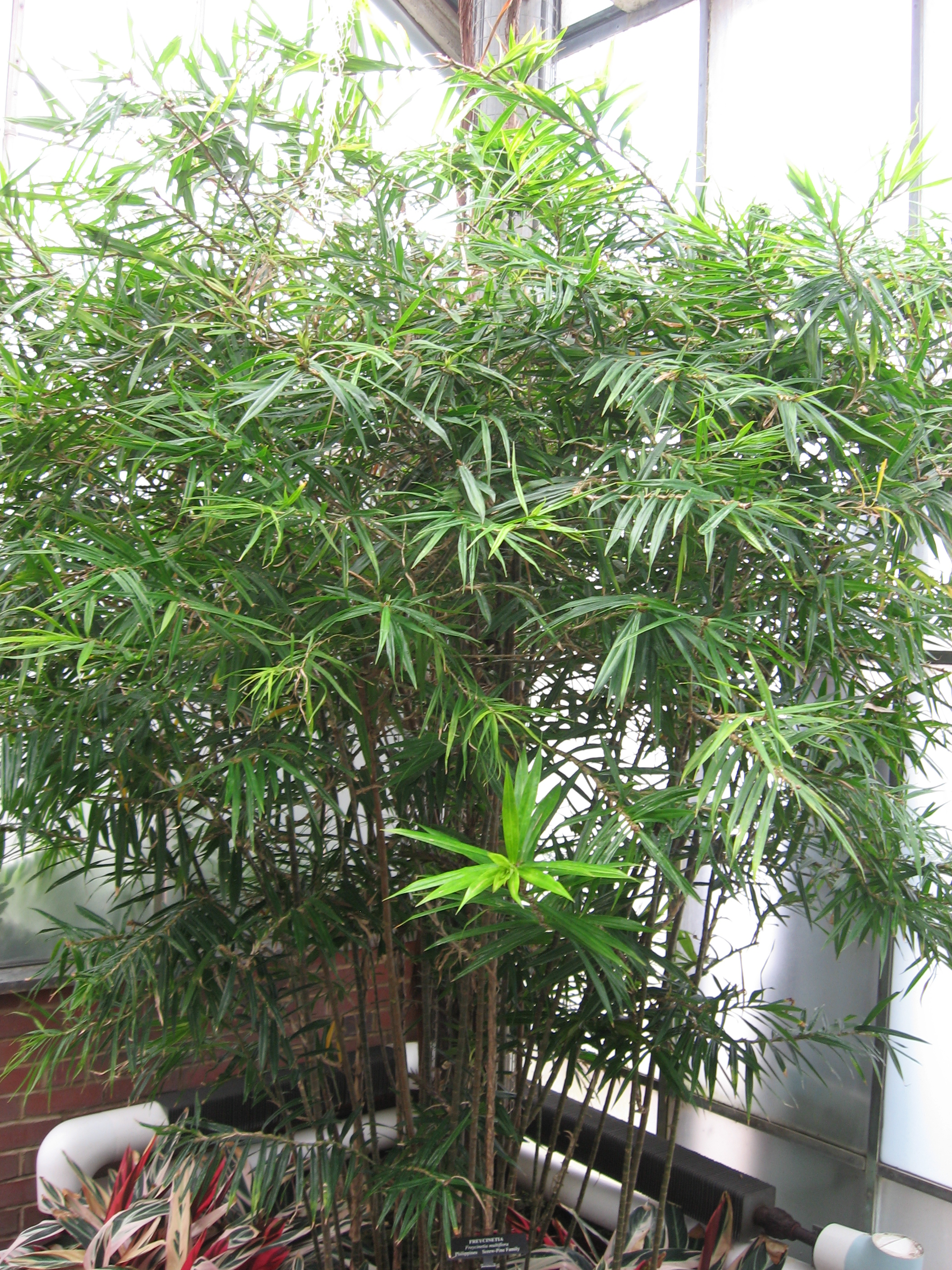

Scientific classification
- Kingdom: Plantae
- Clade: Tracheophytes
- Clade: Angiosperms
- Clade: Monocots
- Order: Pandanales
- Family: Pandanaceae
- Genus: Freycinetia
- Species: F. multiflora

Binomial name
- Freycinetia multiflora Merr.

= Freycinetia multiflora =

Species of flowering plant

Freycinetia multiflora is a species of flowering plant in the family Pandanaceae, found from the Philippines to Sulawesi.
