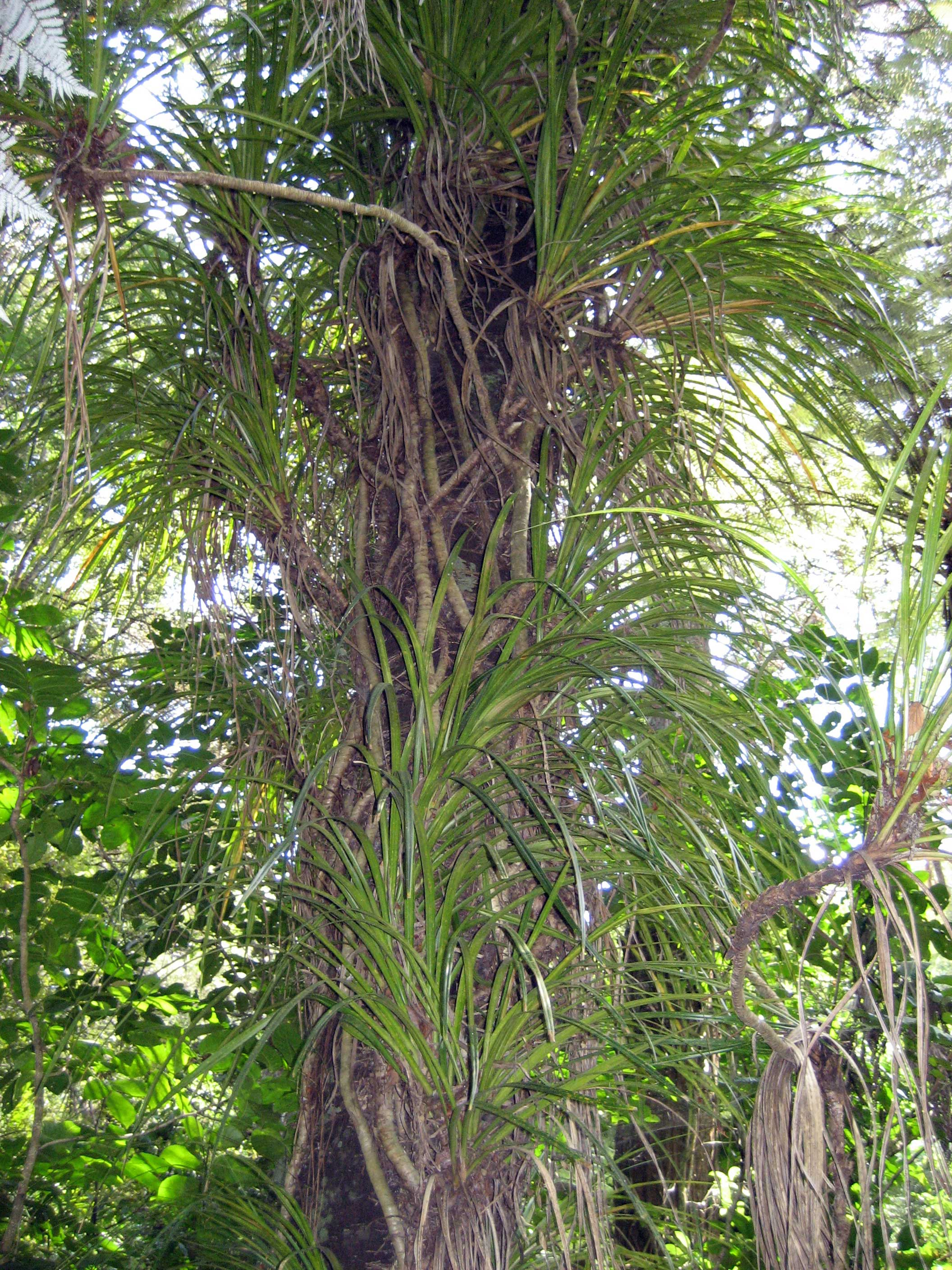
- Kiekie climbing a kohekohe tree

Scientific classification
- Kingdom: Plantae
- Clade: Tracheophytes
- Clade: Angiosperms
- Clade: Monocots
- Order: Pandanales
- Family: Pandanaceae
- Genus: Freycinetia
- Species: F. banksii

Binomial name
- Freycinetia banksii A.Cunn.

Synonyms
- Freycinetia baueriana subsp. banksii (A.Cunn.) B.C.Stone

= Freycinetia banksii =

Species of flowering plant

Freycinetia banksii, commonly known as kiekie, is a densely branched, brittle, woody climber native to New Zealand. It is a member of the screwpalm family Pandanaceae.

== Description ==
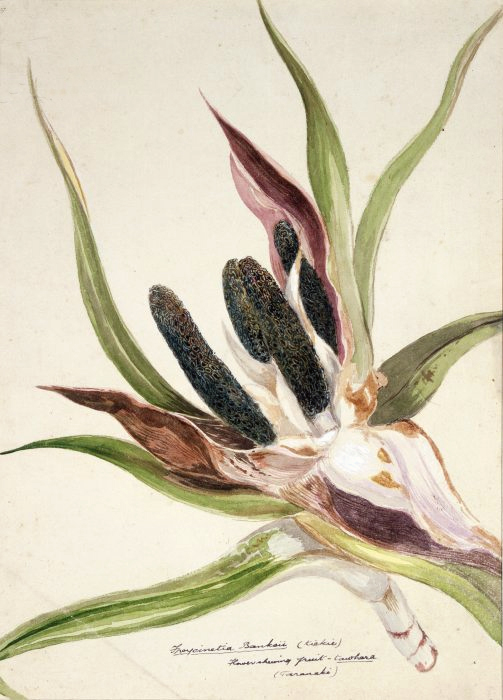
Botanical illustration by Emily Harris of the tāwhara, or flower bracts

Freycinetia banksii is a densely branched woody climber, with numerous cane-like stems up to 40 mm (1.6 in) in diameter, which freely produce aerial roots. It climbs tree trunks, or forms dense tangles on the forest floor. Its stems and leaves are a dominant feature in many areas of New Zealand forest, the stems eventually reaching up to 30 m (98 ft) long. The leaves are long and slender, 60–90 cm (24–35 in) long and 2–2.5 cm (0.79–0.98 in) broad. The plant has white edible flower bracts and long pineapple-like fruit with rough skin and a sweet pink pulp.

== Taxonomy and etymology ==
The species was first described in 1837 by Allan Cunningham. Cunningham named the species after Joseph Banks, the botanist aboard the first voyage of James Cook to New Zealand. In 1973, B.C. Stone argued that F. banksii should be regarded as a subspecies of Freycinetia baueriana of Norfolk Island. Subsequent to this, de Lange et al. (2005:591-592), countered Stone's arguments and retained F. banksii as a distinct species because of significant differences from F. baueriana, including over all growth habit, phyllotaxis, leaf width, vein tessellation, and bract colour (salmon pink to orange in F. baueriana, white to purplish in F. banksii).

Its Māori name is cognate with the Hawaiian ʻieʻie from Proto-Oceanic *kiRekiRe for Freycinetia in general. Tāwhara, the name for the plant's edible flower bracts, is likely etymologically linked with other Polynesian words that describe bunches of bananas, while the name for the fruit, ureure, likely stems from the fruit's phallic appearance.

Freycinetia banksii is the only member of Pandanaceae native to New Zealand.

== Distribution ==
The plant is endemic to New Zealand. Freycinetia banksii is found in forests throughout the North Island, primarily in coastal and montane forests. In the South Island, kiekie is more common in higher rainfall areas, reaching its southern limit near the Clarence River in the east and in Fiordland in the west.

== Ecology ==
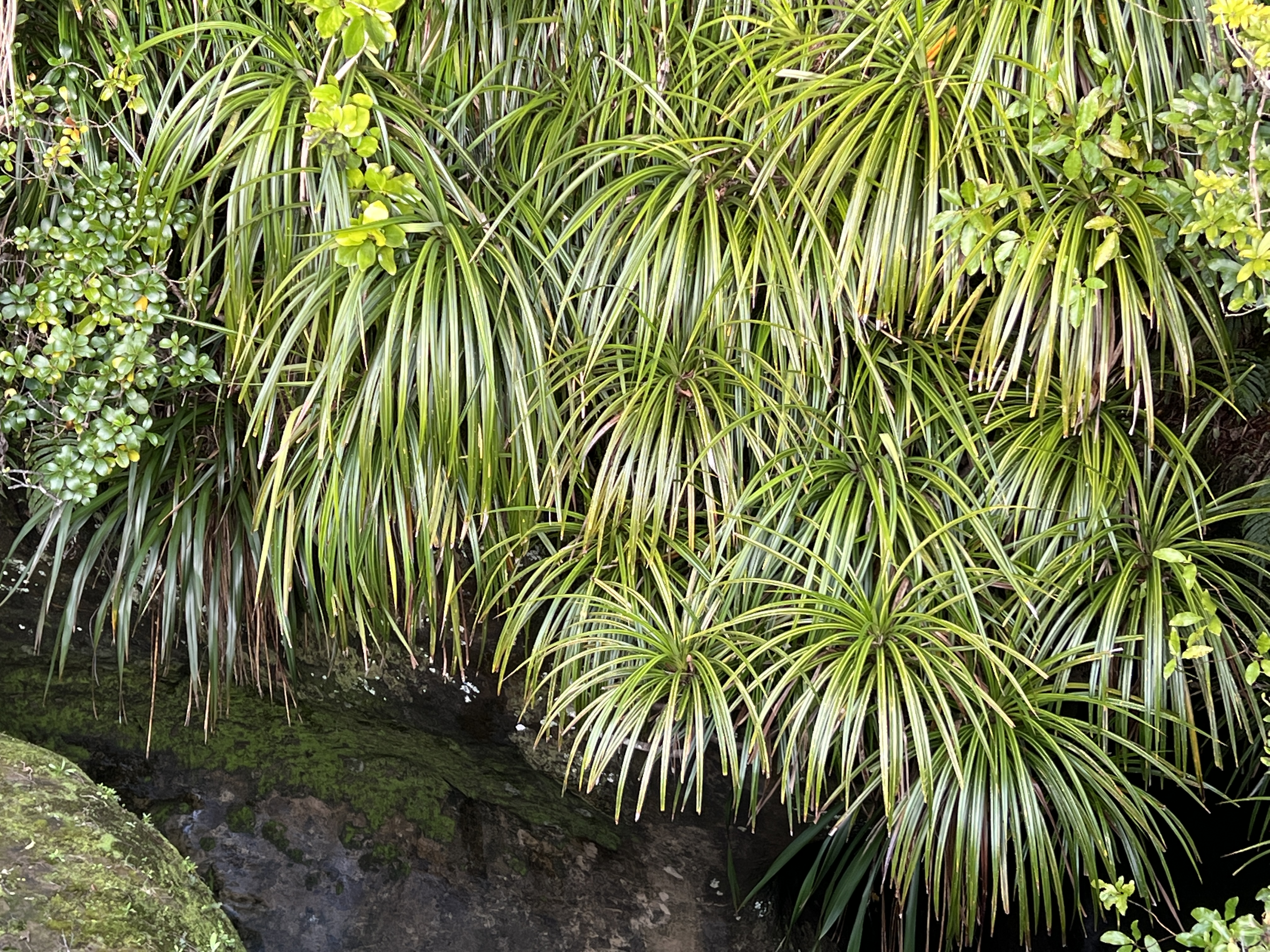
Freycinetia banksii is typically an epiphyte, but in places where no suitable trees are present, can form dense masses of tangled roots.

Freycinetia banksii typically climbs trunks of larger trees in forested areas. If no trees are near the plant, Freycinetia banksii can form masses of tangled roots.

The fruit and flower bracts of Freycinetia banksii are eaten by possums and rats.

== Māori cultural uses and traditions ==
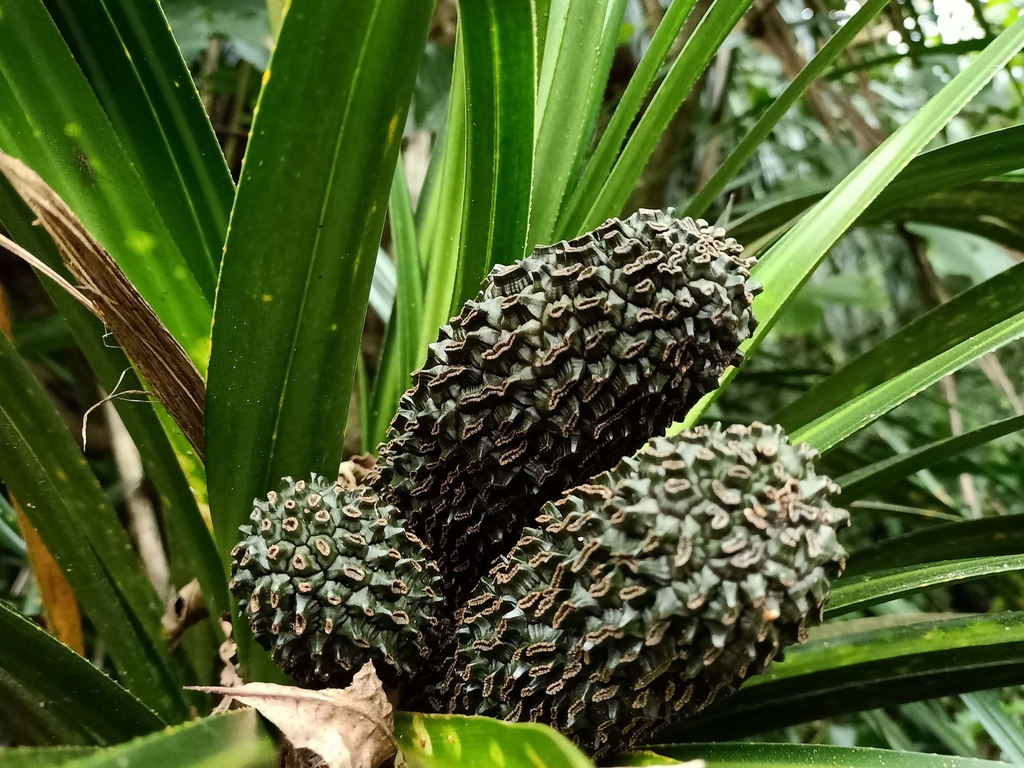
The ureure, or fruit of the kiekie. Both the fruit and flower bracts are traditional Māori sources of food

Kiekie is an important plant in Māori culture. It was traditionally a major source of textiles, especially to Ngāi Tūhoe and other iwi (tribes) who lived inland and away from areas where harakeke (New Zealand flax) grows, and is a traditional delicacy, prized for its two yearly crops, the first being the sweet flower bracts (tāwhara) followed by the fruit (ureure). Māori myths describe kiekie and harakeke as separated brothers. Harakeke left to go with the goddess Wainuiātea to the coasts, while kiekie remained with Tāne, the god of the forests.

Ureure were often gathered by using a forked stick. The flower bracts were traditionally tied up using leaves of the plant, to protect the flowers from being eaten by kiore (the Polynesian rat).

The leaves were used widely for plaiting and weaving, although the broader leaves of New Zealand flax were preferred because they provided more material. Kiekie was preferred for closely woven items, tukutuku, such as kete pūtea and kete pure. Items woven included mats and temporary baskets for holding food. The aerial roots were gathered to use as a binding material for implements and for making fish traps and sails.

Elements of the plant are present in a number of place names, such as the Tāwharanui Peninsula and Maungakiekie.

== Gallery ==
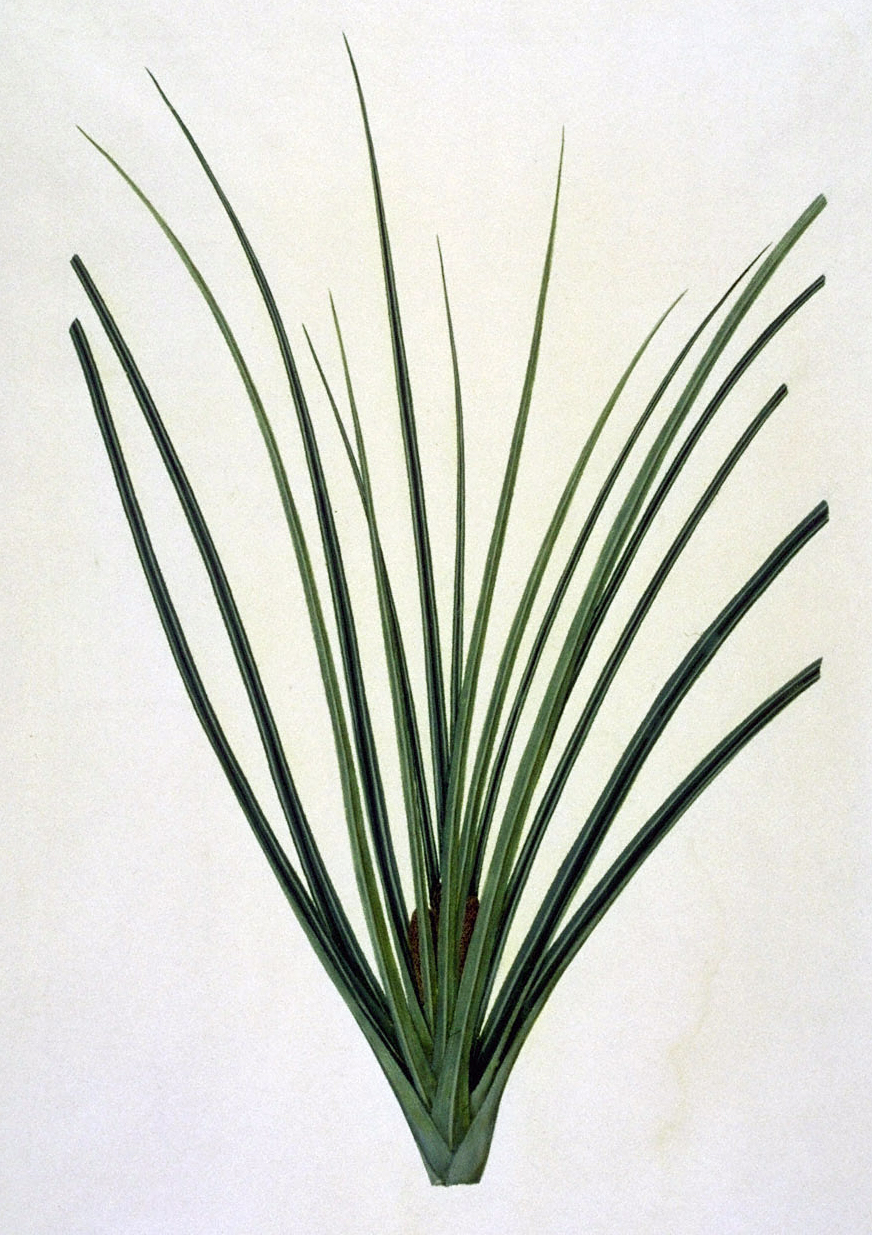
Illustration by Frederick Polydore Nodder, c. 1780

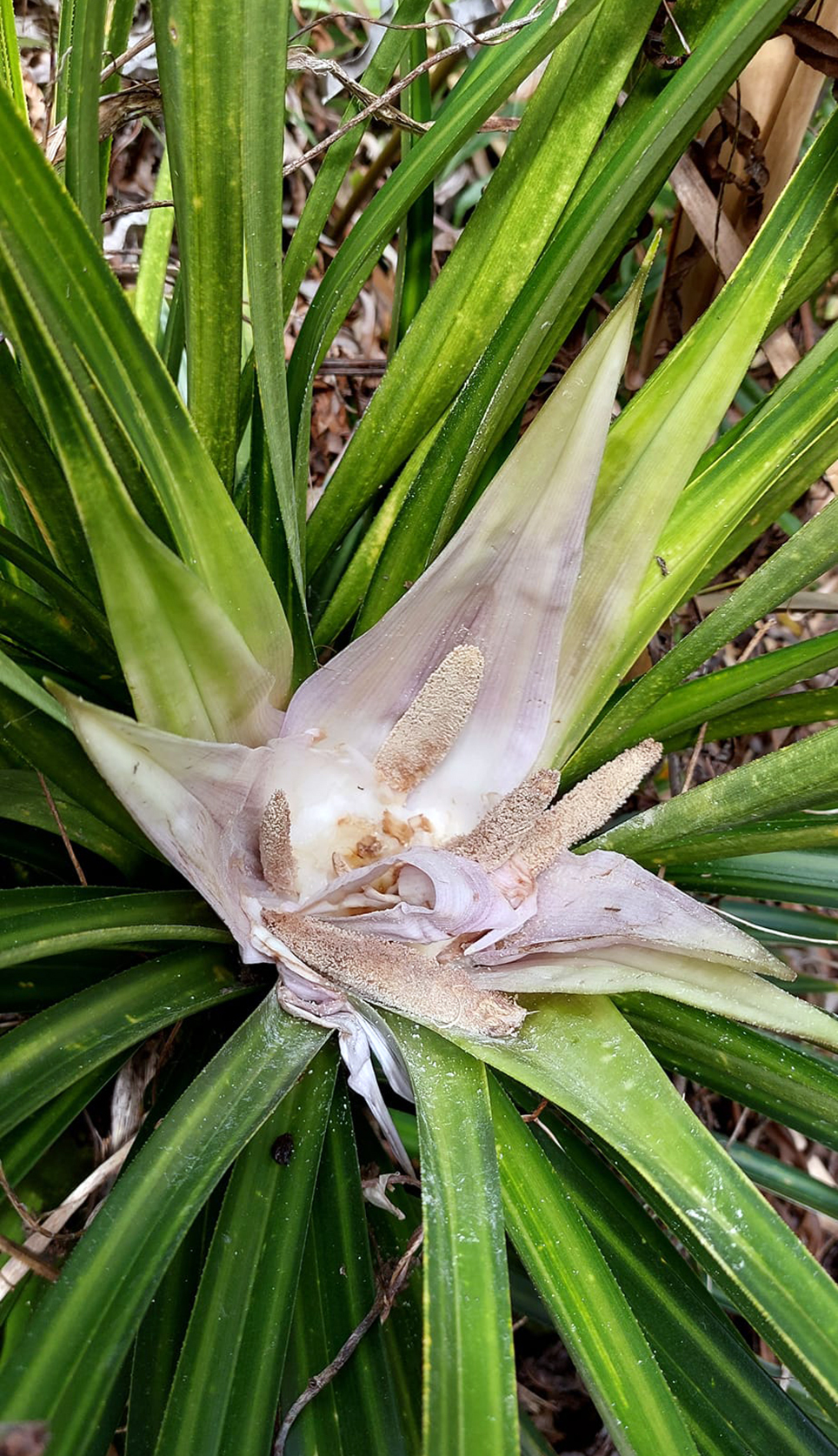
Flower bract

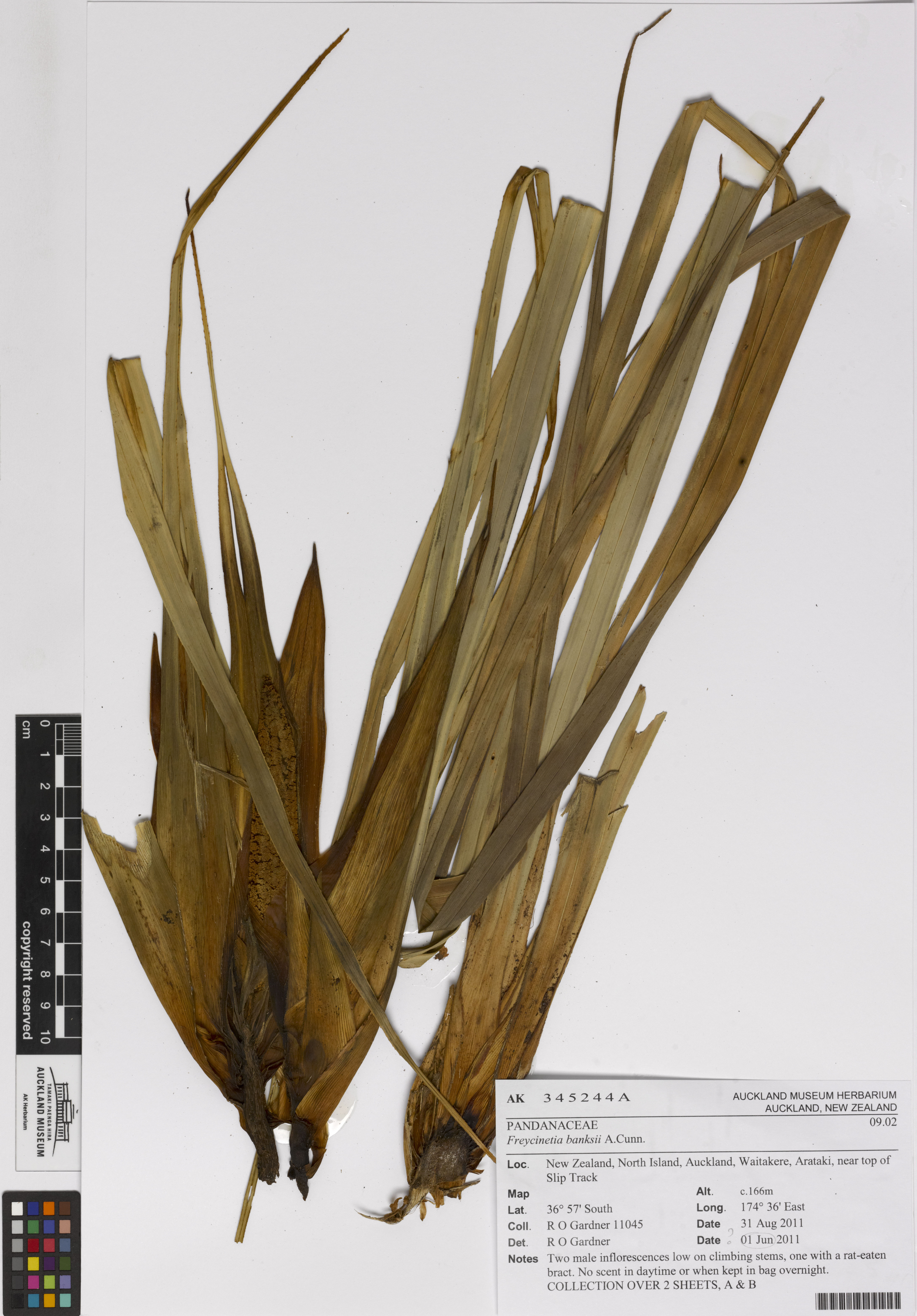
Herbarium specimen

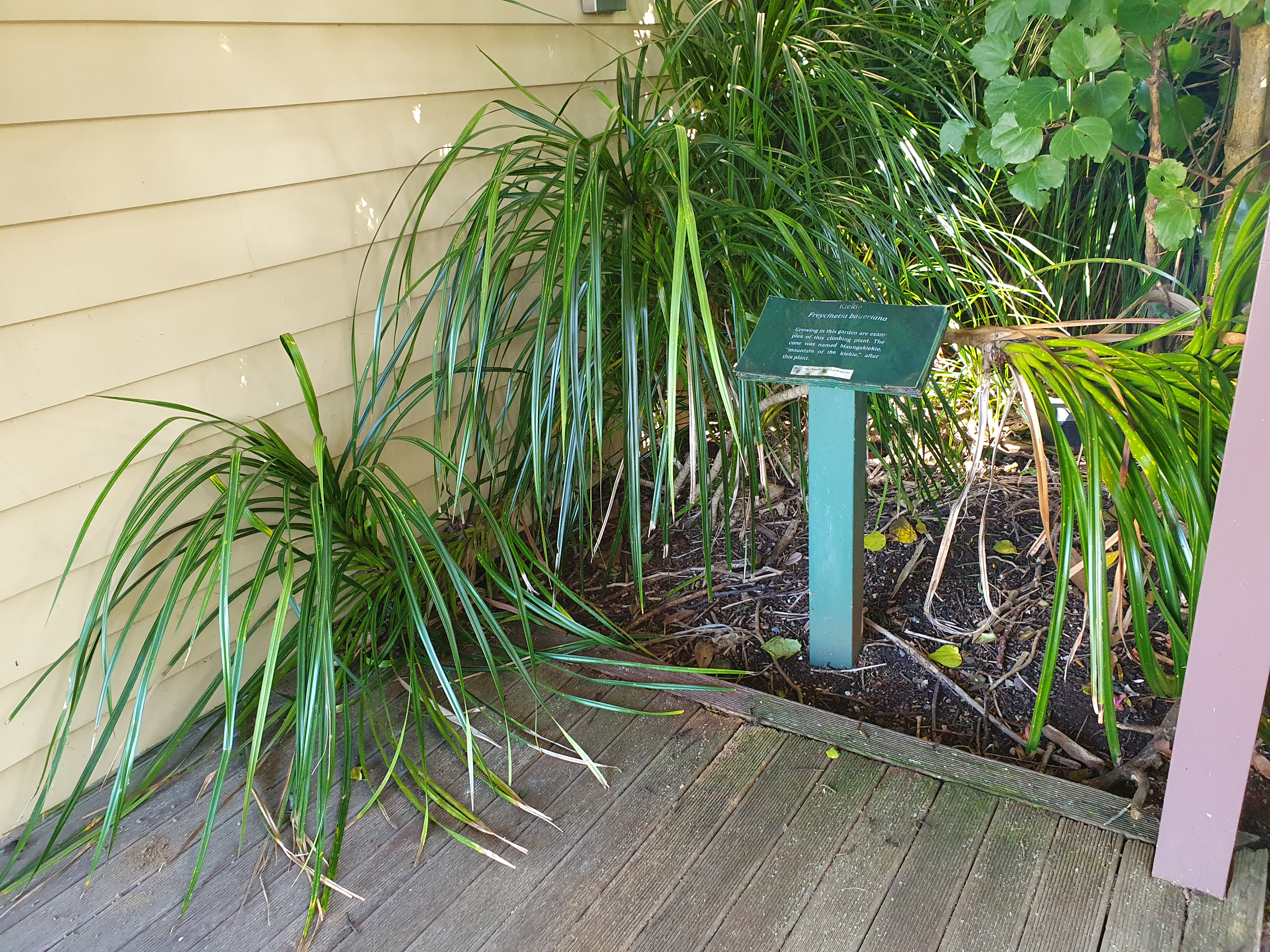
Kiekie display on Maungakiekie, Auckland

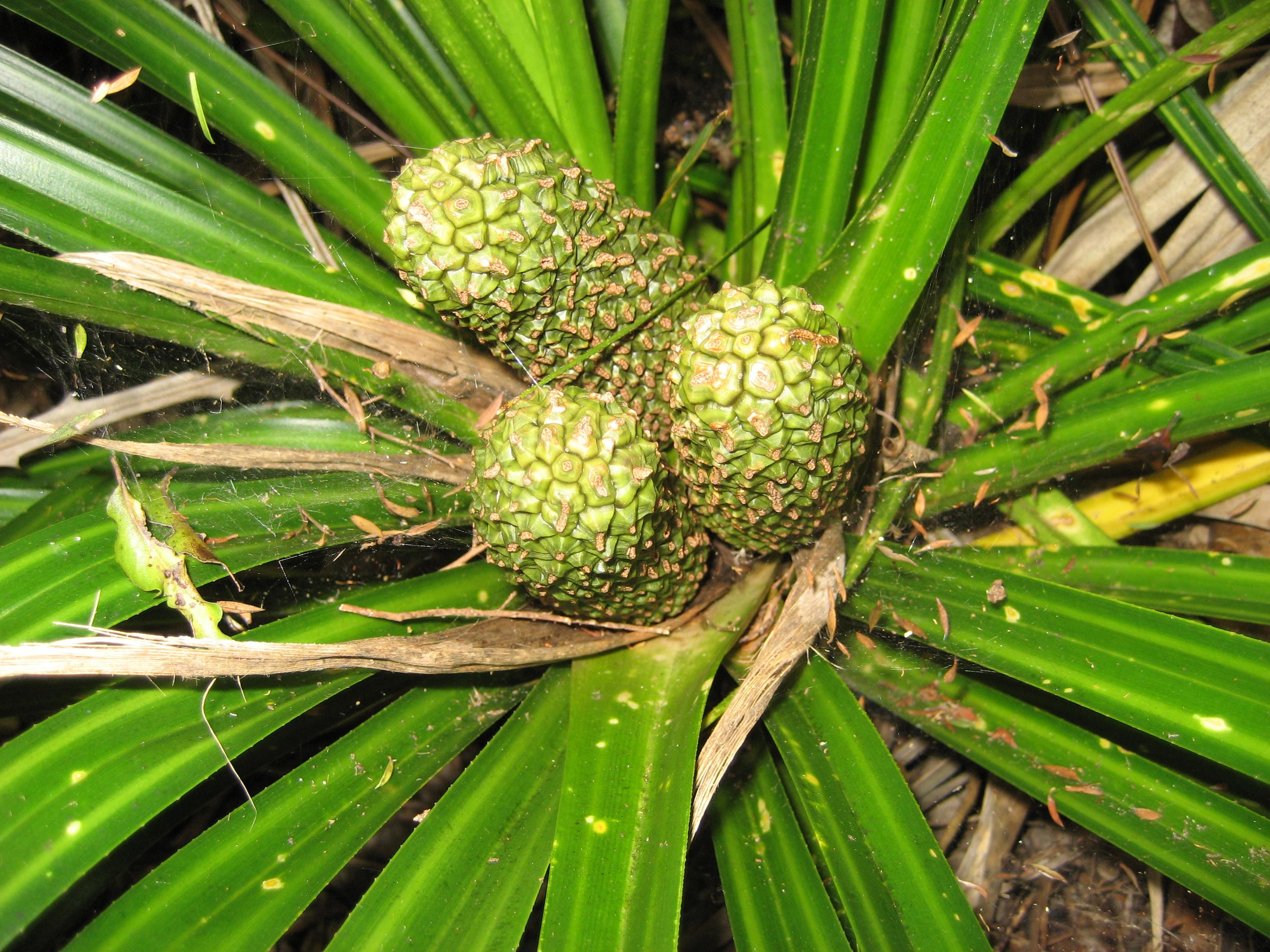
Developing fruit

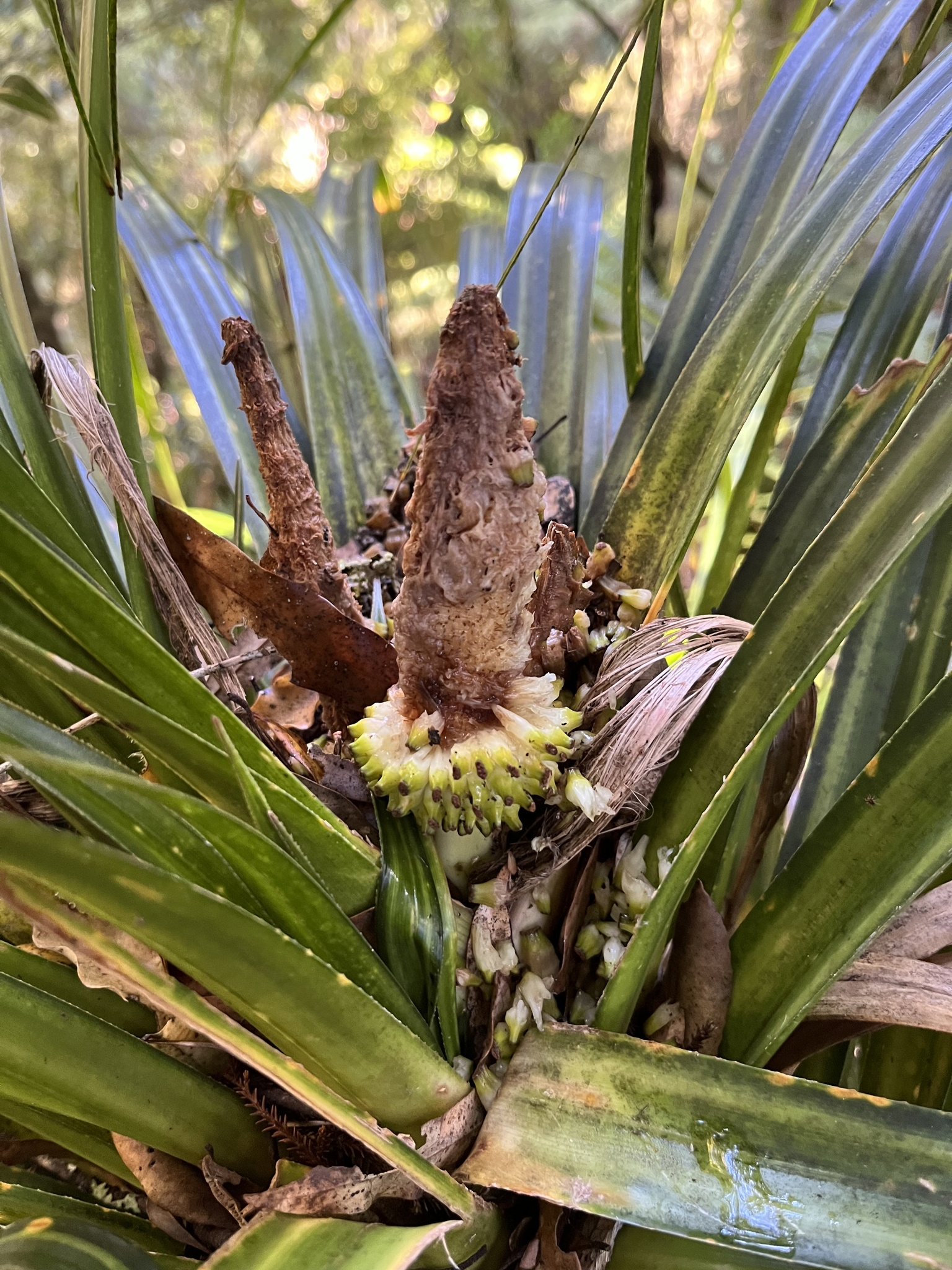
Partially eaten fruit
