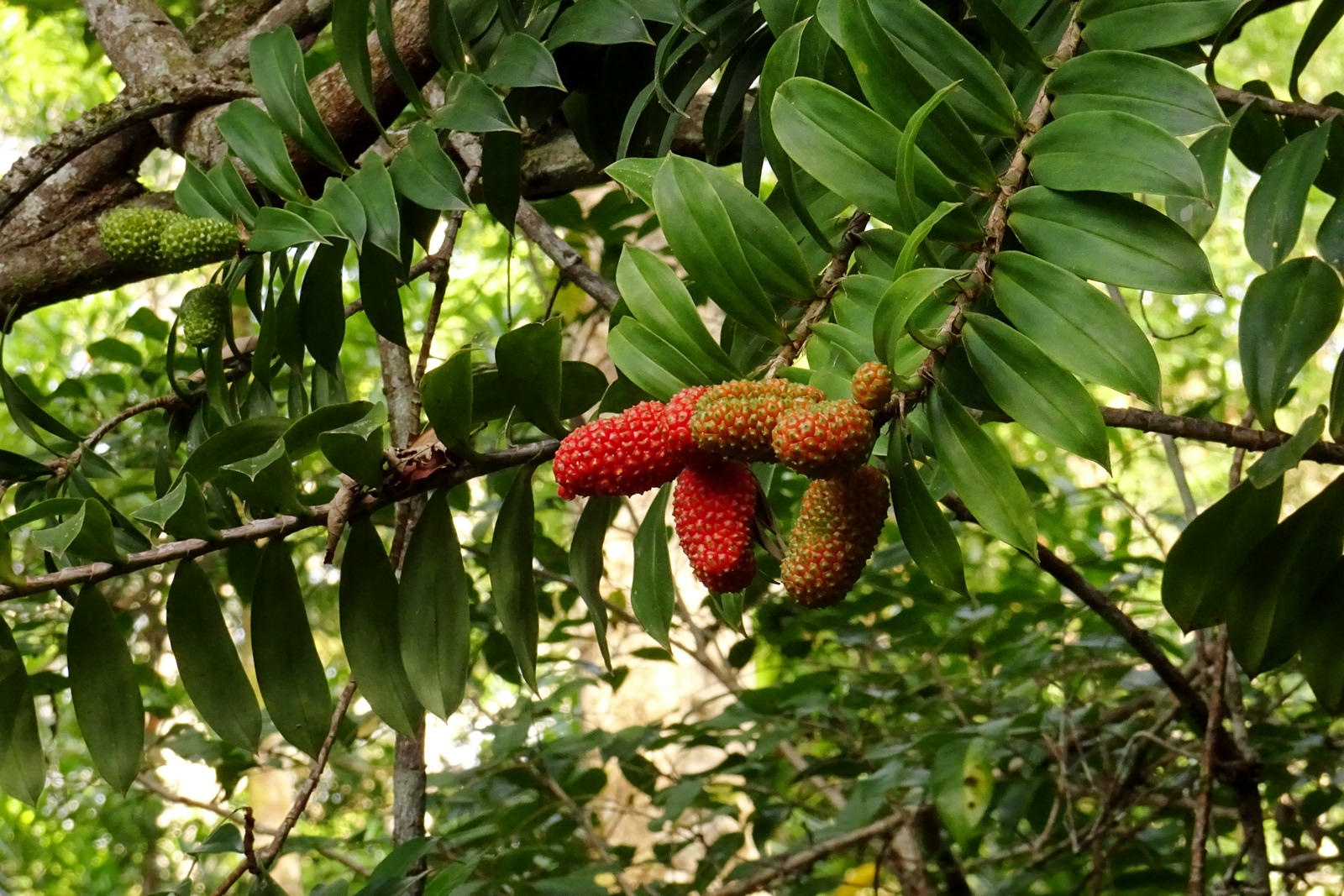

Scientific classification
- Kingdom: Plantae
- Clade: Embryophytes
- Clade: Tracheophytes
- Clade: Spermatophytes
- Clade: Angiosperms
- Clade: Monocots
- Order: Pandanales
- Family: Pandanaceae
- Genus: Freycinetia
- Species: F. scandens

Binomial name
- Freycinetia scandens Gaudich.

= Freycinetia scandens =

climbing pandan

Species of flowering plant

Freycinetia scandens is a species of climbing plant in the family Pandanaceae native to Papua New Guinea, Malesia and Queensland, Australia.
