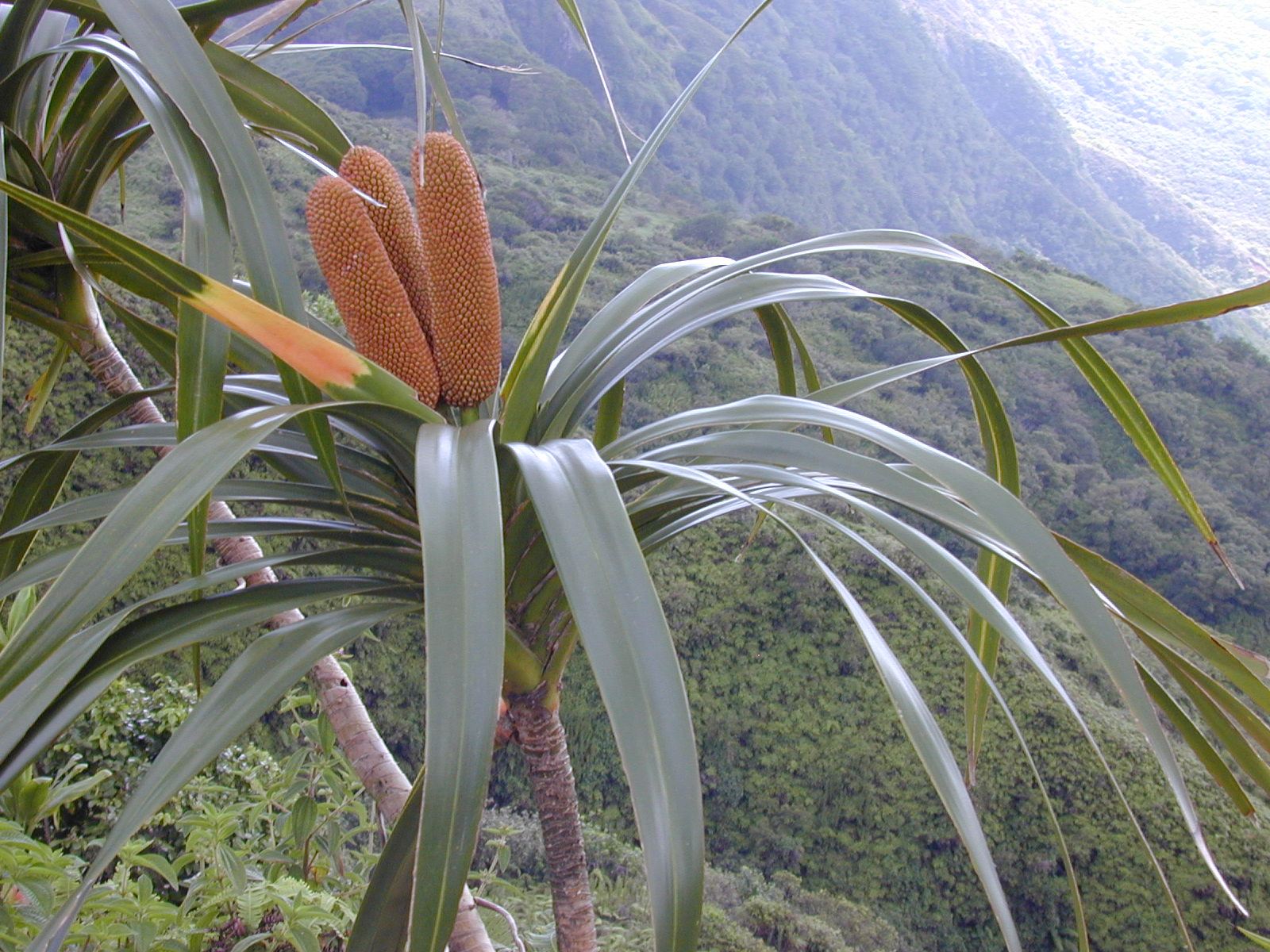
- Fruit

Scientific classification
- Kingdom: Plantae
- Clade: Embryophytes
- Clade: Tracheophytes
- Clade: Angiosperms
- Clade: Monocots
- Order: Pandanales
- Family: Pandanaceae
- Genus: Freycinetia
- Species: F. arborea

Binomial name
- Freycinetia arborea Gaudich.

= Freycinetia arborea =

Species of plant

Freycinetia arborea, or ʻIeʻie, is a densely branched, brittle, woody climber in the family Pandanaceae, endemic to the Pacific Islands. ʻIeʻie is found in moist forest on the Hawaiian, Marquesas, Austral, Society, and Cook Islands, and Samoa It grows into the forest canopy, attaching itself to a host tree using aerial roots. It may also grow as a sprawling tangle on the forest floor.

The name originates from Proto-Oceanic *kiRekiRe reflected in other Freycinetia plants with related names across Polynesia: ʻieʻie in Tahiti refers to Freycinetia demissa while New Zealand's Freycinetia banksii is the kiekie.

== Description ==
The shiny green leaves have pointed ends and are spiny on the lower side of the midrib and along the edges. Leaves measure 40–80 centimetres (16–31 in) long and 1–3 centimetres (0.39–1.18 in) wide, and are spirally arranged around the ends of branches. Flowers form on spike-like inflorescences at the end of branches, and are either staminate or pistillate. Staminate spikes are yellowish-white and up to 10 centimetres (3.9 in) in length. Pistillate spikes are 3–4 centimetres (1.2–1.6 in) but elongate to 7.5–9.5 centimetres (3.0–3.7 in) once fruit are produced. Three to four spikes are surrounded by orange-salmon bracts. Fruit is 1 centimetre (0.39 in) long and contains many 1.5-millimetre (0.059 in) seeds. The bracts and fruit of the ʻieʻie were a favorite food of the ʻōʻū (Psittirostra psittacea), an extinct Hawaiian honeycreeper that was formerly a principal seed dispersal vector for plants with small seeded, fleshy fruits in low elevation forests. It is also a favored food of the ʻalalā (Corvus hawaiiensis), which is currently extinct in the wild.

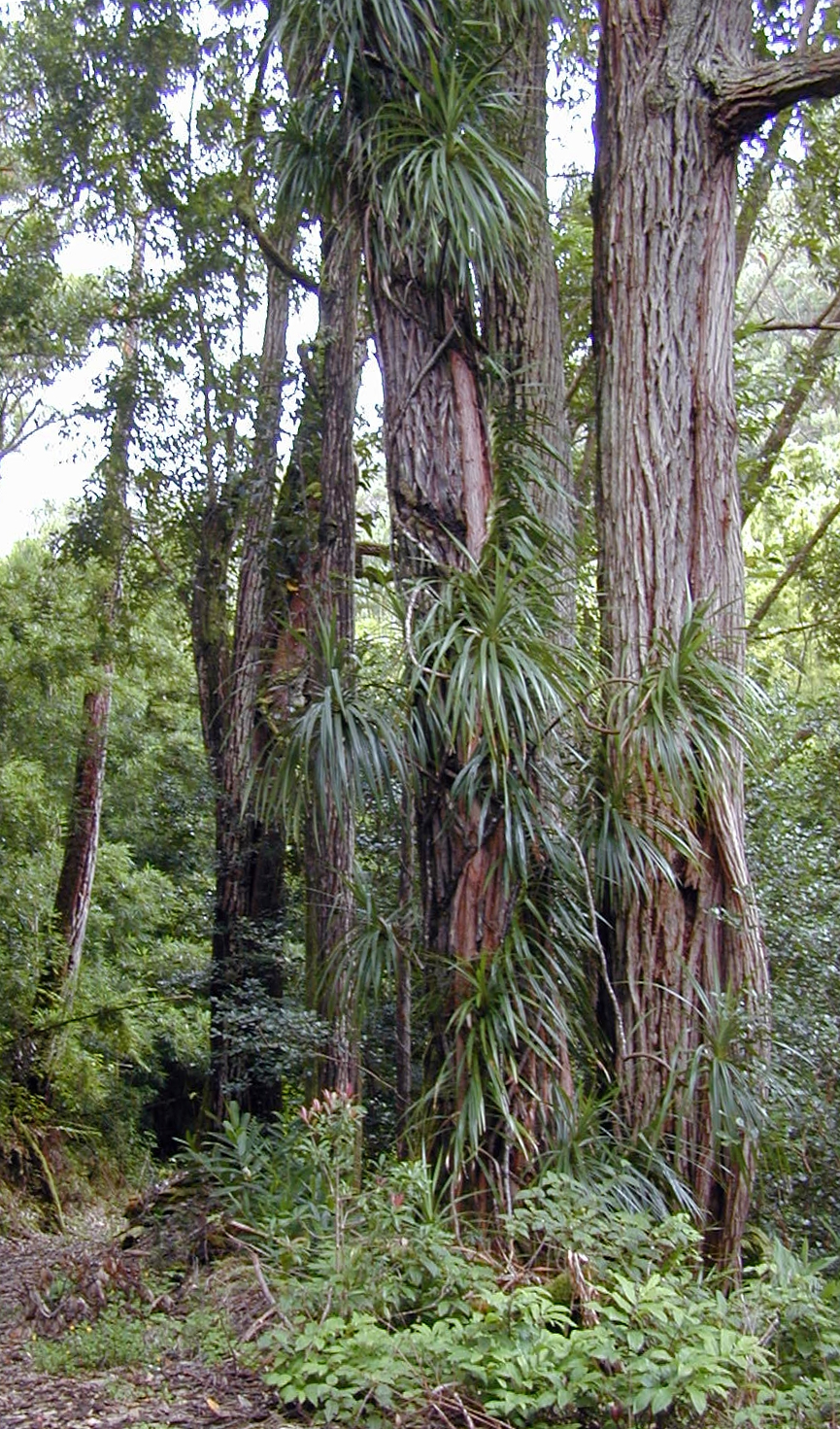
A ʻieʻie climbing on a Eucalyptus

== Uses ==
Native Hawaiians plaited ʻieʻie into hīnaʻi hoʻomoe iʻa (fish baskets), hīnaʻi hoʻoluʻuluʻu (fish traps). The vine (or rather the split aerial roots) also became the framework for helmets worn by the aliʻi (mahiole iʻe).
