= Freycinetia sumatrana =

Scientific classification
- Kingdom: Plantae
- Clade: Tracheophytes
- Clade: Angiosperms
- Clade: Monocots
- Order: Pandanales
- Family: Pandanaceae
- Genus: Freycinetia
- Species: F. sumatrana

Binomial name
- Freycinetia sumatrana Hemsl.

Synonyms
- Freycinetia amboinensis Martelli; Freycinetia auriculata Merr.; Freycinetia ceramensis Martelli; Freycinetia kurziana Martelli; Freycinetia loheri Martelli; Freycinetia lucida Martelli; Freycinetia sumatrana var. penangiana B.C.Stone; Freycinetia valida Ridl.

Species of flowering plant

Freycinetia sumatrana is a species of plant in the family Pandanaceae. It is native to Indo-China and Malesia.
