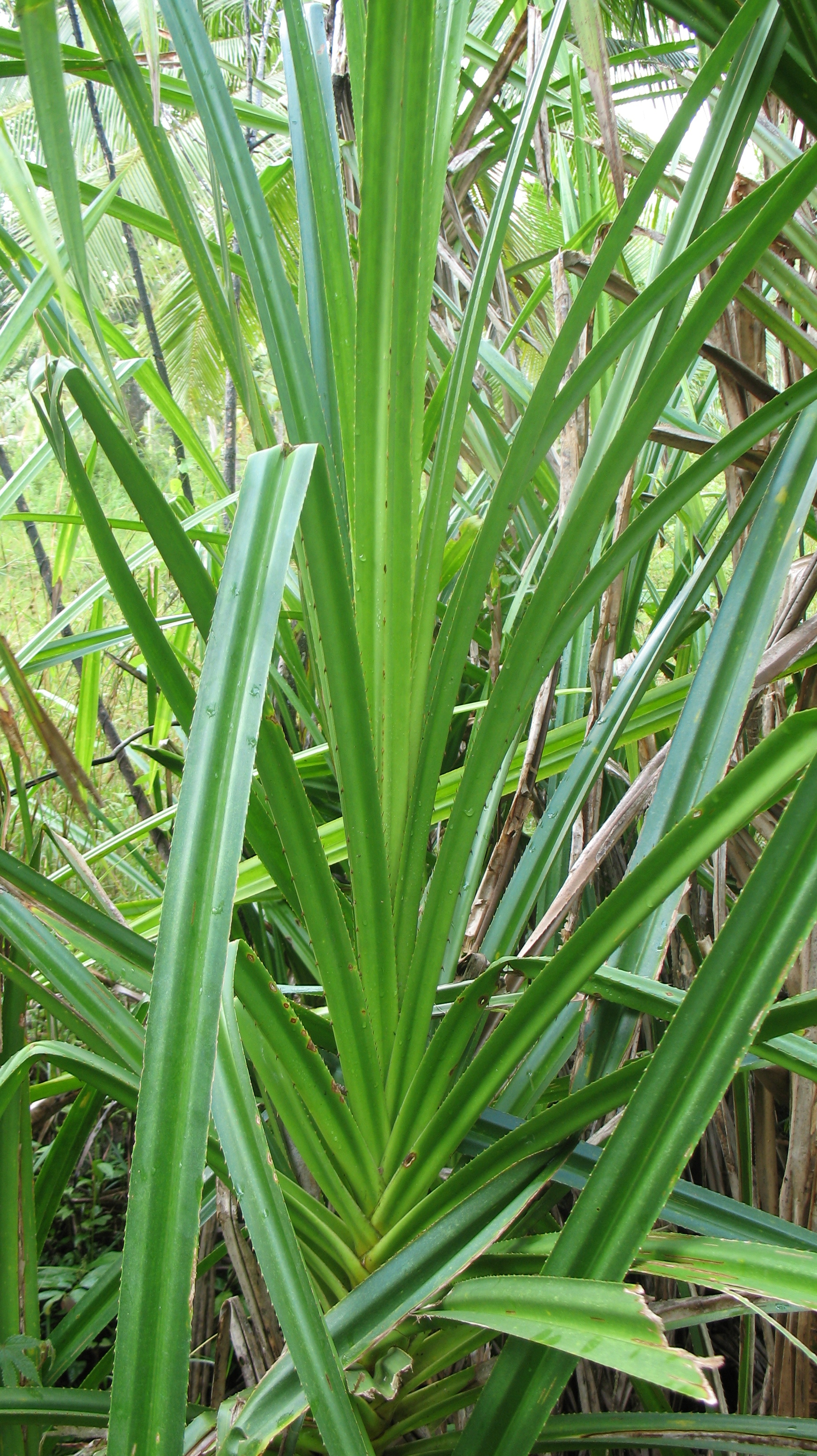
- Leaves of Sararanga sinuosa

Scientific classification
- Kingdom: Plantae
- Clade: Tracheophytes
- Clade: Angiosperms
- Clade: Monocots
- Order: Pandanales
- Family: Pandanaceae
- Genus: Sararanga; Hemsl.

Species
- See text

= Sararanga =

Genus of flowering plants

Sararanga is a genus of flowering plants in the family Pandanaceae, with two species that occur in the Philippines, the northern part of New Guinea, the Bismarck Archipelago and the Solomon Islands. They are palm-like, dioecious trees. The genus name comes from the species of these plants named sararang in the Solomon Islands.

== Species ==
- Sararanga philippinensis Merr., Publ. Bur. Sci. Gov. Lab. 29: 5 (1905).
- Sararanga sinuosa Hemsl., J. Linn. Soc., Bot. 30: 216 (1894).
