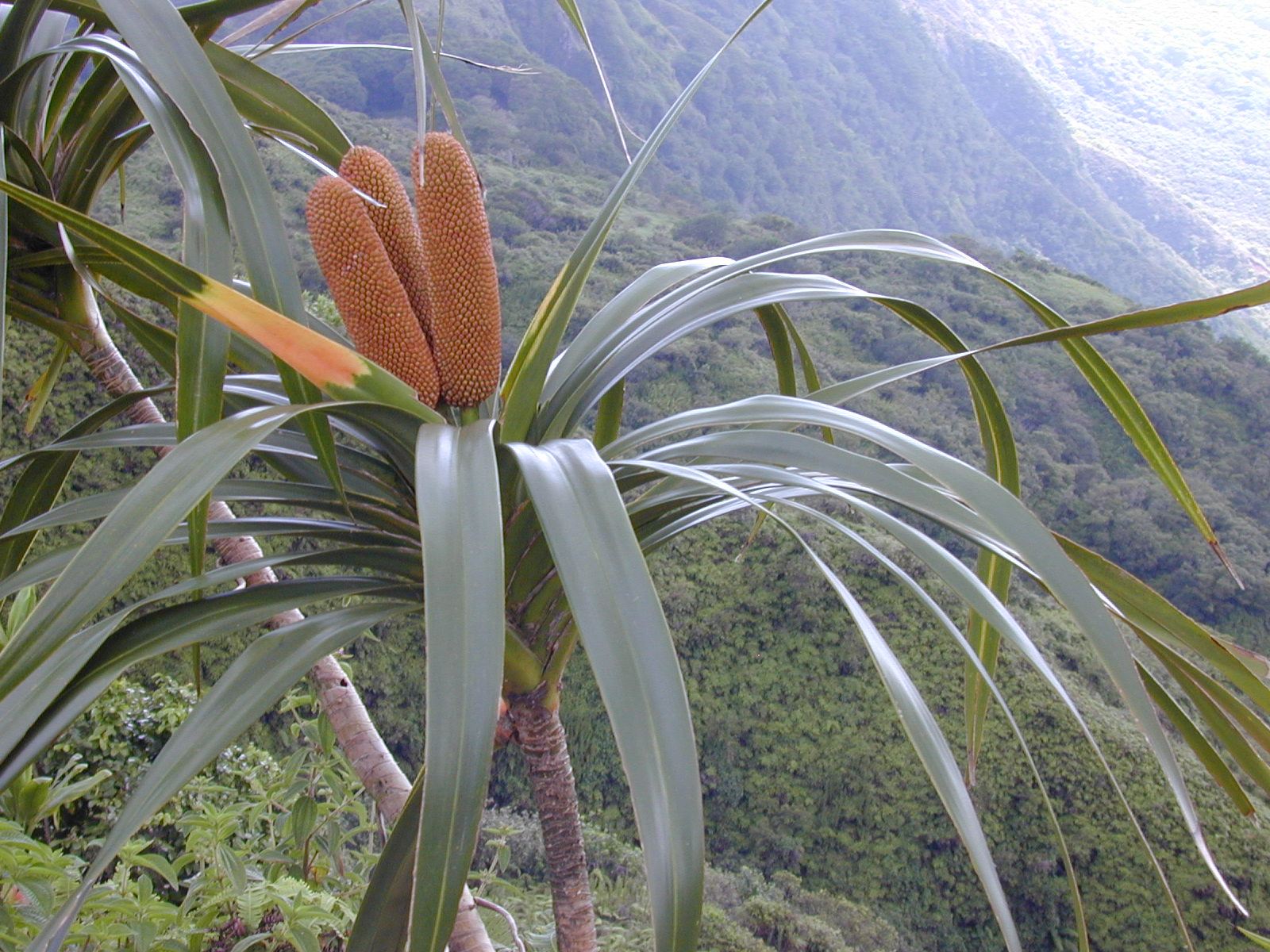
- Freycinetia arborea

Scientific classification
- Kingdom: Plantae
- Clade: Tracheophytes
- Clade: Angiosperms
- Clade: Monocots
- Order: Pandanales
- Family: Pandanaceae
- Genus: Freycinetia; Gaudich.

Species
- See List of Freycinetia species

Synonyms
- Victoriperrea Hombr. & Jacquinot ex Decne.; Jezabel Banks ex Salisb.

= Freycinetia =

Genus of flowering plants

Freycinetia is one of the five extant genera in the flowering plant family Pandanaceae. As of November 2024, the genus comprises approximately 300 species. The type species is Freycinetia arborea.

== Description ==
Species of Freycinetia are woody lianas which climb by means of adventitious roots. The stem of the largest of them may reach up to 7 cm (2.8 in) diameter, but most are much smaller. Leaves are simple, long linear to ovate, sessile; they are arranged in three spirals and venation is parallel. Leaf margins are often toothed or with small spines; the underside of the midrib may also be toothed. Inflorescences are terminal on normal leafy shoots or specialised lateral shoots, and are branched (rarely unbranched) spadices. All species are dioecious, meaning that male and female flowers are borne on separate plants. The fruit is a berry, usually grouped into cylindrical or globose 'heads', often red in colour.

== Distribution ==
The species are distributed through the tropics and subtropics of Southeast Asia and Oceania. They are found in Sri Lanka, the Andaman and Nicobar Islands, Bangladesh, Myanmar, Cambodia, Vietnam, Taiwan, the Ryukyu Islands, Thailand, Malaysia, Indonesia, the Philippines, the Marianas, the Caroline Islands, New Guinea, the Bismarck Archipelago, the Solomon Islands, Vanuatu, New Caledonia, Samoa, the Cook Islands, Fiji, Tonga, Hawaii, the Society Islands, the Australian states of the Northern Territory, Queensland and New South Wales, Norfolk Island, and New Zealand, as well as other smaller island groups throughout the Pacific.

They have been found growing in tropical forests, coastal forests, humid mountain forests and associated biomes, from sea level to mountains cloud forests.

== Taxonomy ==
The genus was created by French botanist Charles Gaudichaud-Beaupré in 1824 to accommodate plants he collected during an exploratory voyage of the Pacific between 1817 and 1820. He named it for Admiral Louis de Freycinet, the commander of the ship he sailed on. Initially, Gaudichaud included three species, namely F. aborea, F. radicans, and F. scandens.

== Species with articles ==
For a complete list of species, see List of Freycinetia species

- Freycinetia arborea Gaudich. – Pacific Islands
- Freycinetia banksii A.Cunn. – New Zealand
- Freycinetia excelsa F.Muell. – Australia, New Guinea
- Freycinetia marginata Blume – Australia, New Guinea
- Freycinetia multiflora Merr. – Philippines
- Freycinetia scandens Gaudich. – Australia, New Guinea, Malesia
- Freycinetia sumatrana Merr. – Indo-China, Malesia

== Gallery ==
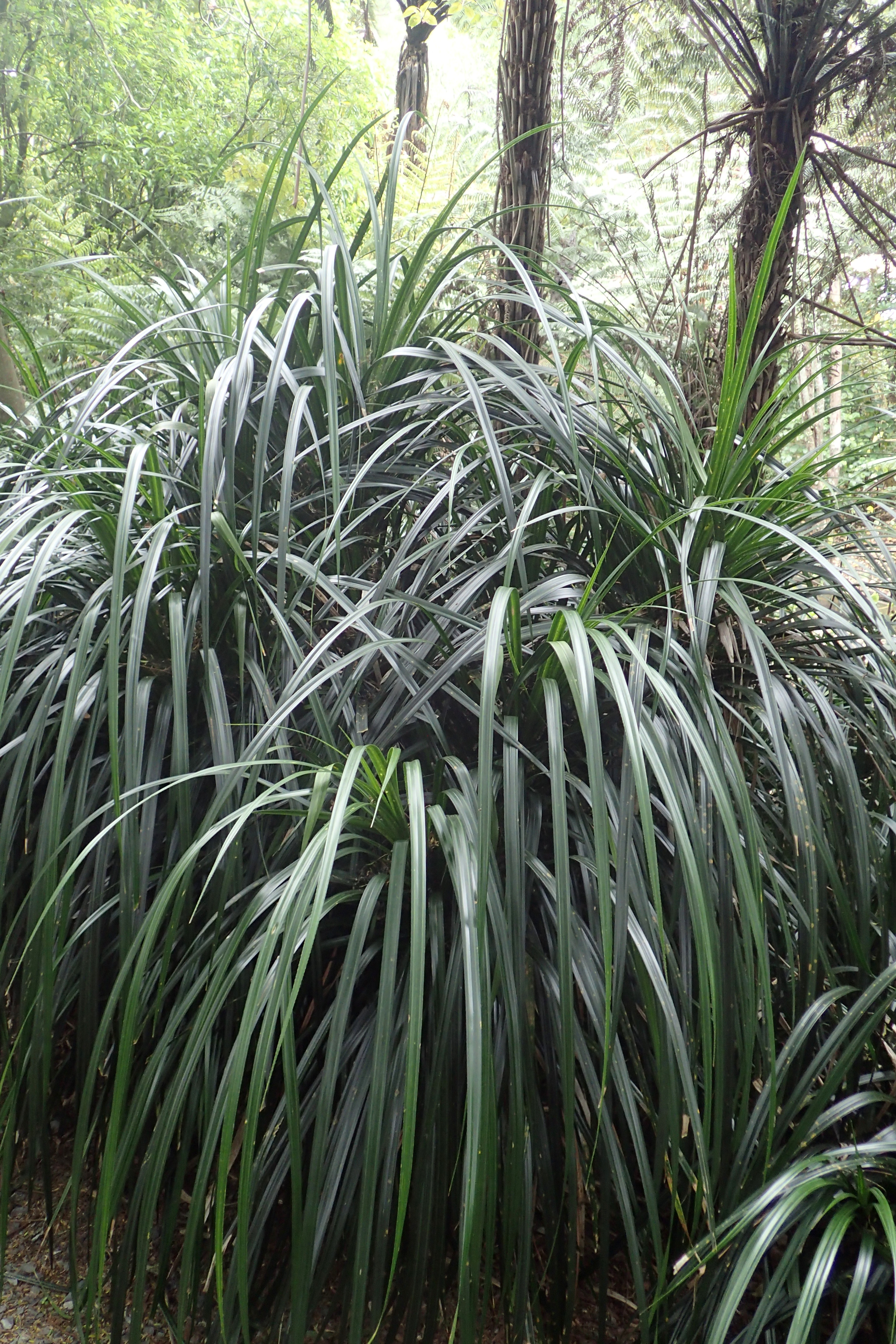
Freycinetia banksii

Frecinetia aborea

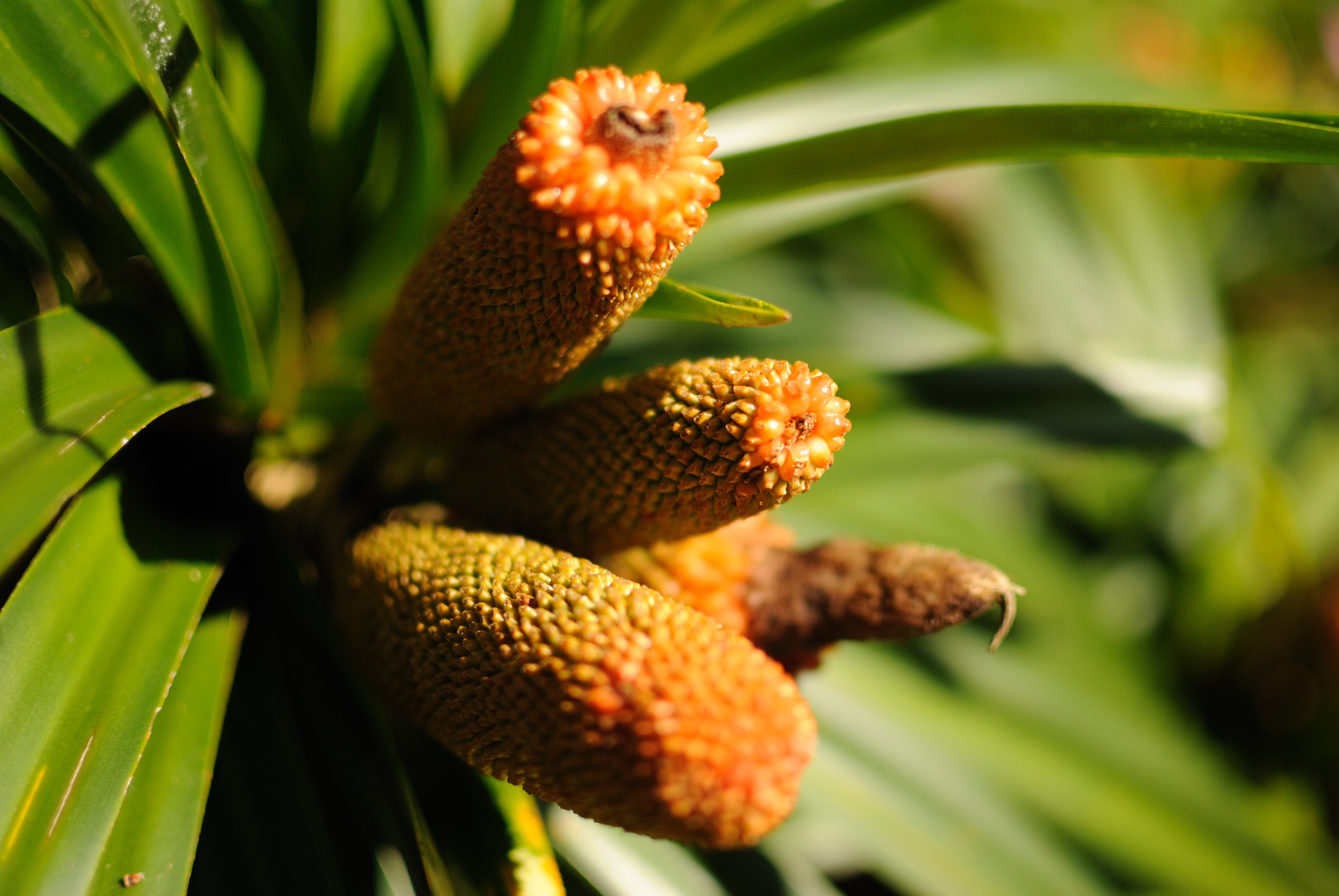
Frecinetia aborea fruit

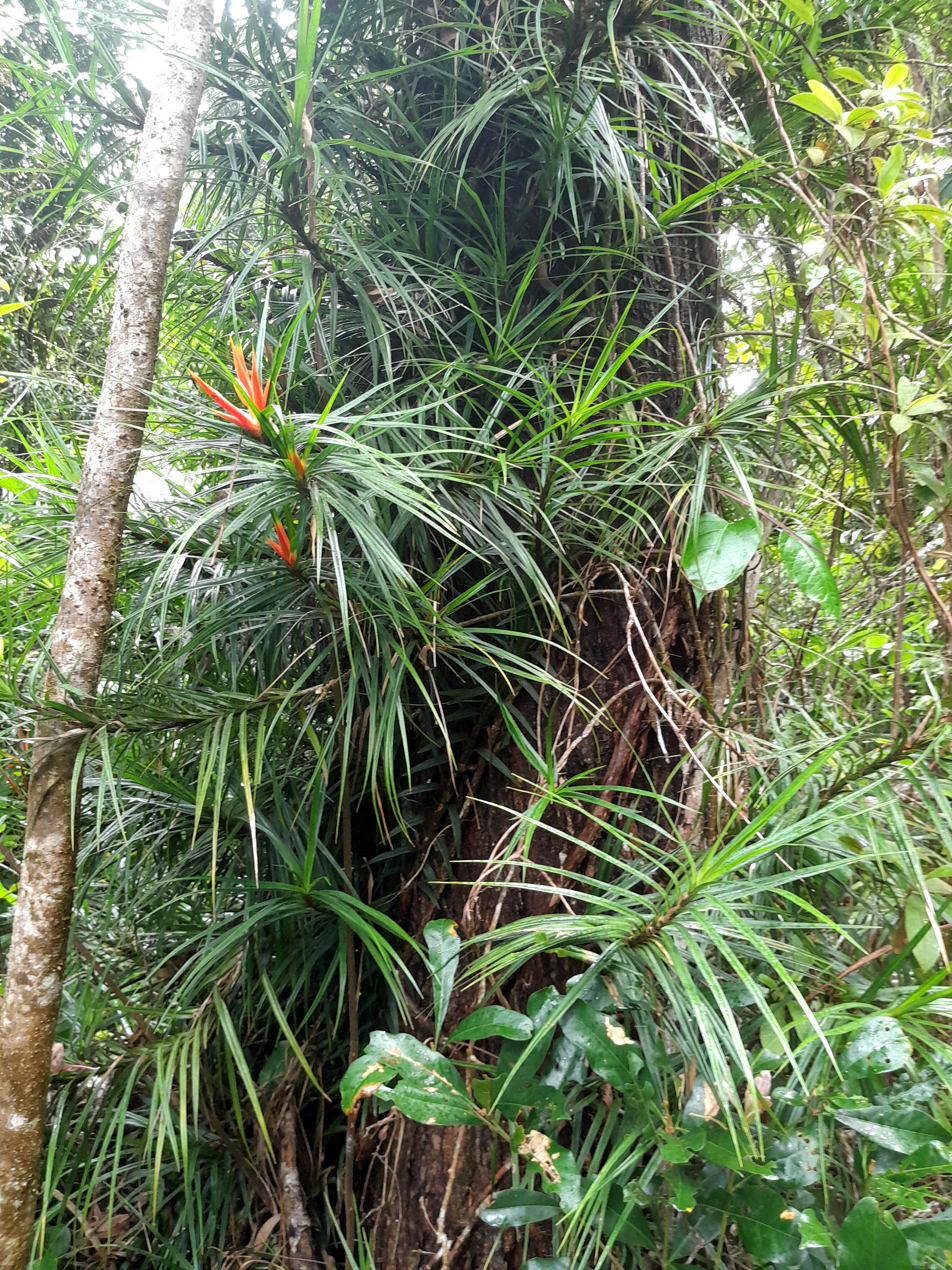
Freycinetia excelsa

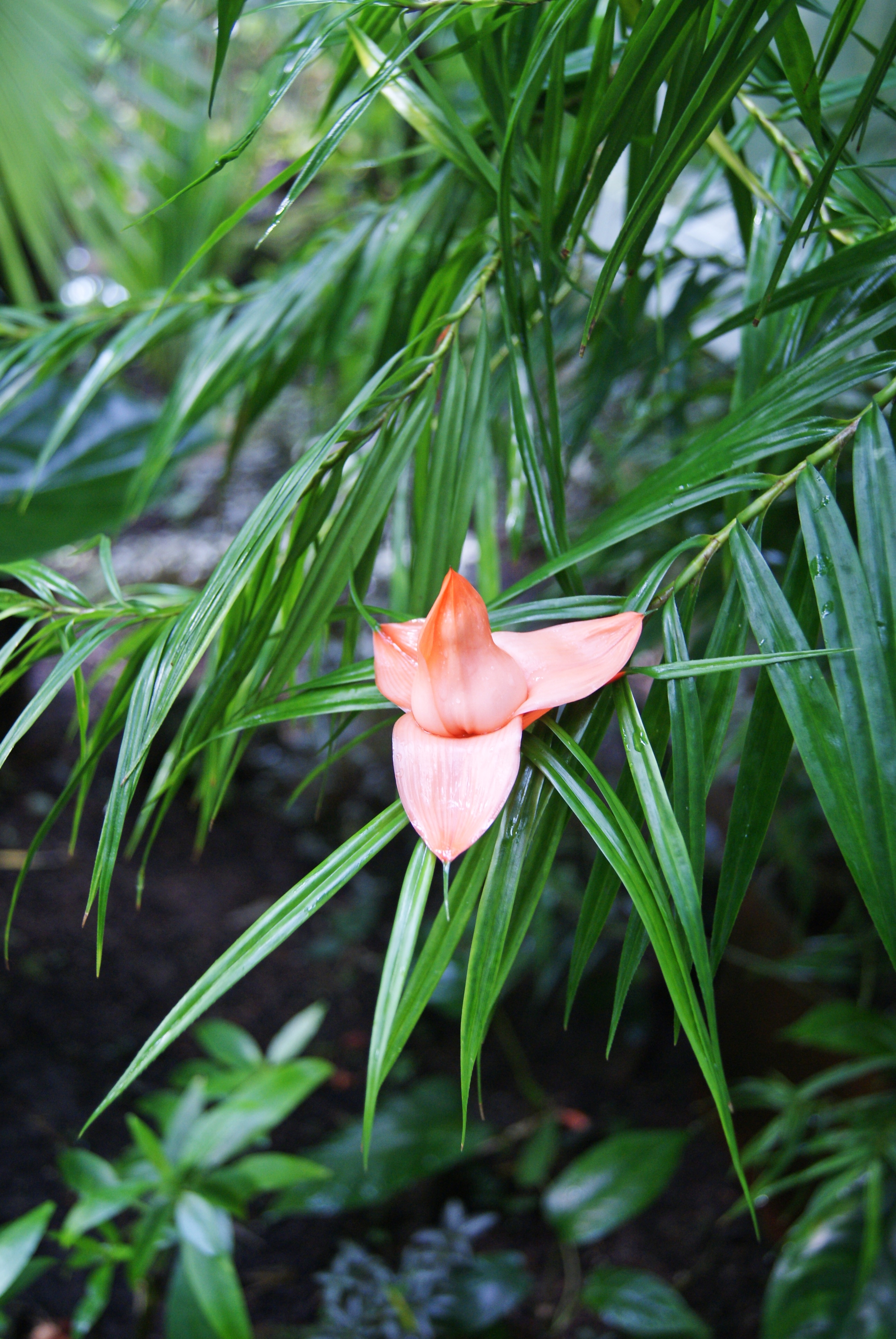
Freycinetia cumingiana

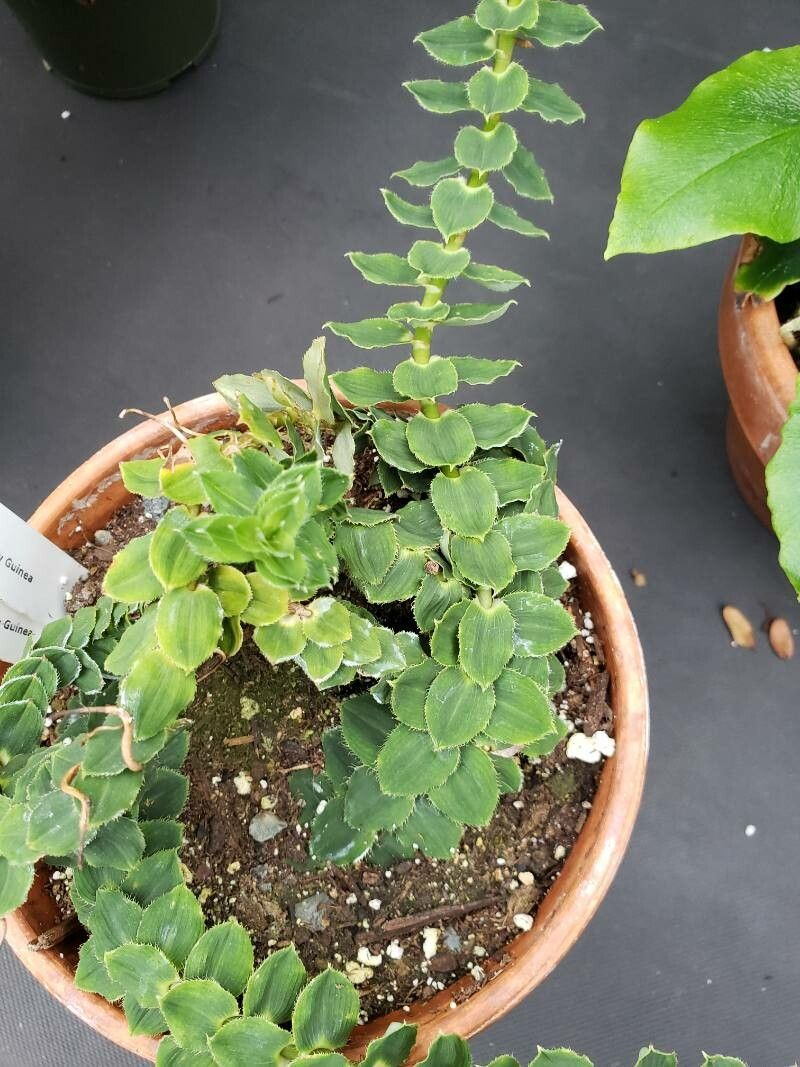
Freycinetia elegantula

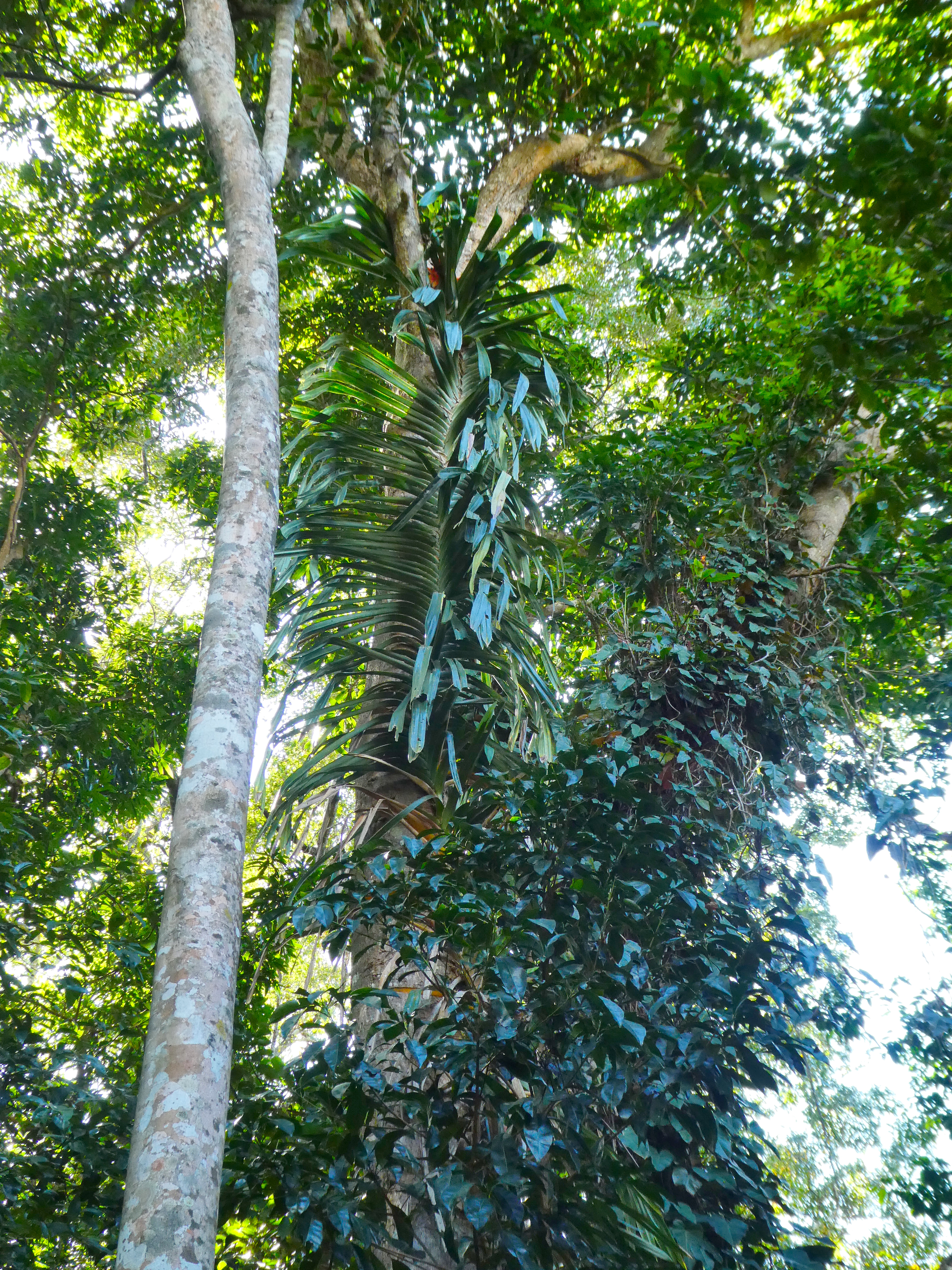
Freycinetia marginata

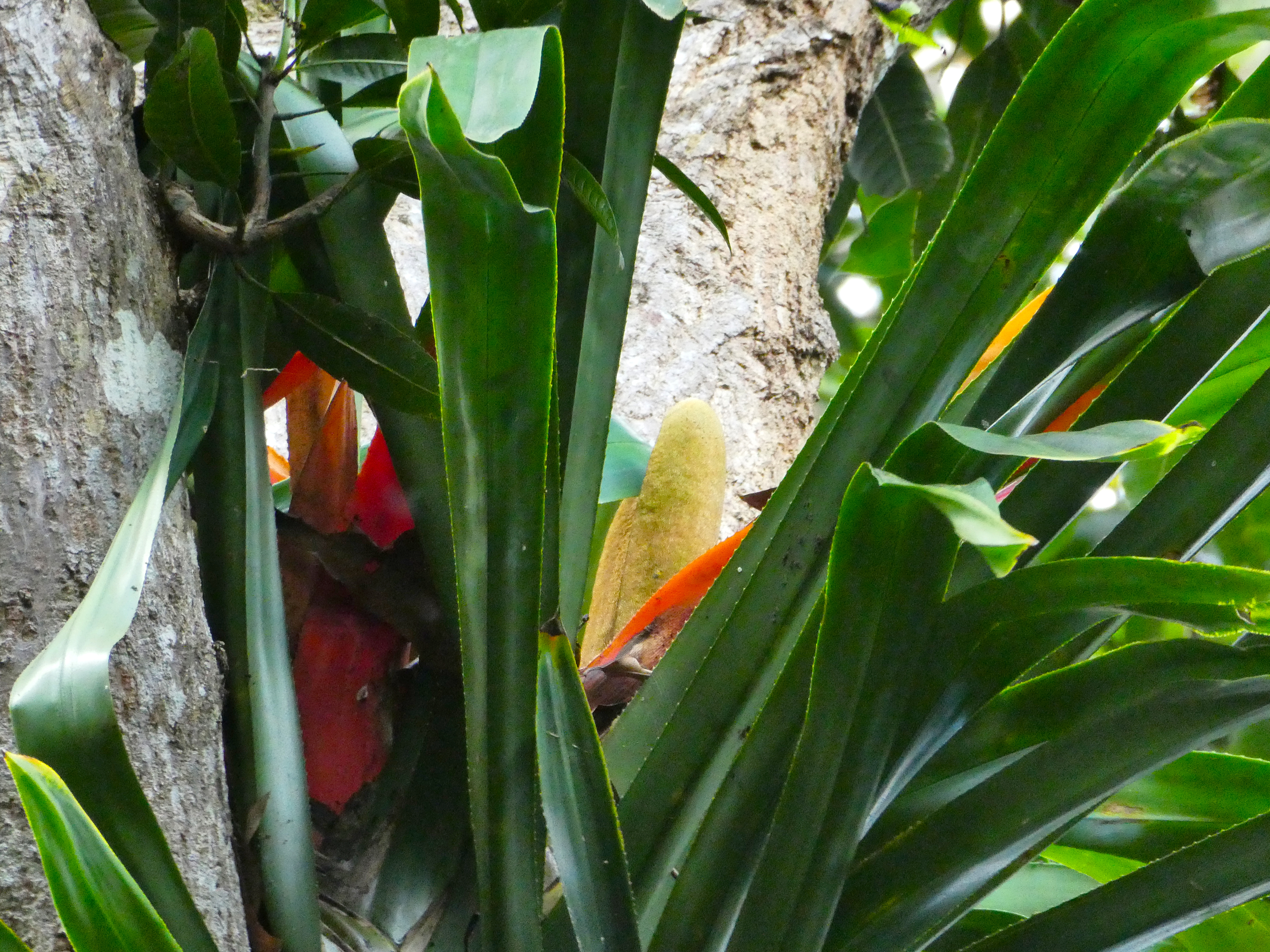
Freycinetia marginata with spadices

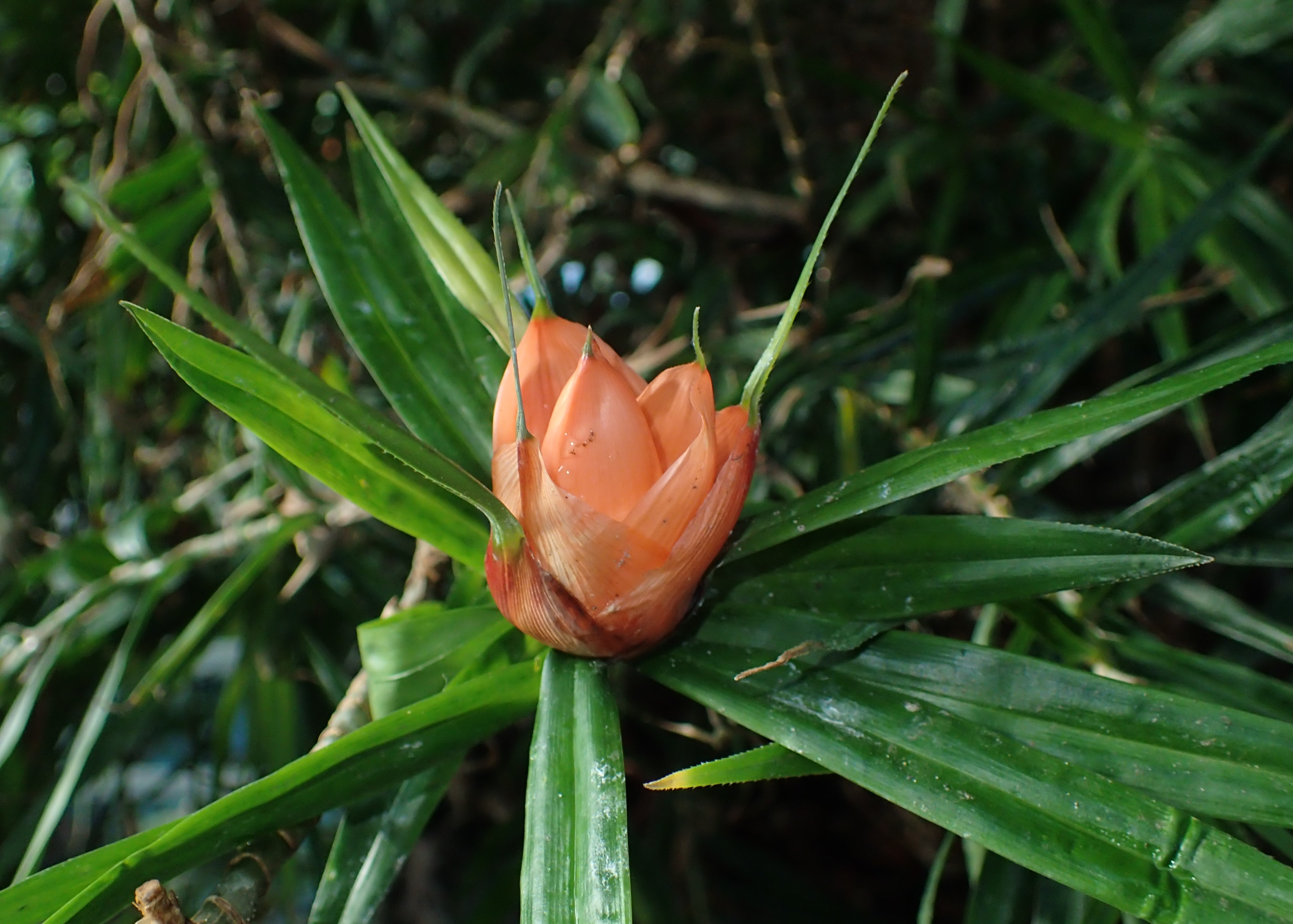
Freycinetia luzonensis
