= Rodolfo Emilio Giuseppe Pichi-Sermolli =

Italian botanist (1912–2005)

- Born: 24 February 1912; Florence, Italy
- Died: 22 April 2005 (aged 93); Montespertoli, Italy
- Occupation: Botany

Rodolfo Emilio Giuseppe Pichi-Sermolli (24 February 1912 – 22 April 2005) was an Italian botanist. The standard author abbreviation Pic.Serm. is used to indicate this person as the author when citing a botanical name.

He was born in Florence, son of Giuseppe Pichi-Sermolli and Maria née Del Rosso. He graduated in natural history from the University of Florence in 1935. He married Carla Bernardini on 9 April 1942, and they went on to have two children.

He was assistant at the Institute of Botany in the University of Florence from 1935 to 1958, then became professor of botany at the University of Sassari in Sardinia from 1958 to 1959. From 1959 he was professor at the Institute of Botany in the University of Genoa and director of the Botanical Garden. He was a specialist on the ecology and phytogeography of tropical Africa, and also worked in plant taxonomy and pteridology.

== Selected bibliography ==
- Pichi-Sermolli, Rudolfo E. G. Authors of Scientific Names in Pteridophyta. Royal Botanic Gardens, Kew. 1996. 78pp, PB. ISBN 0-947643-90-7.
- Pichi-Sermolli, Rudolfo E. G. Index Filicum, Supplementum Quartum, pro Annis 1934–1960 [Index to the Ferns, Fourth Supplement, for Years 1934–1960]. International Bureau for Plant Taxonomy and Nomenclature, Utrecht, Netherlands. 1965. vi/370 pp., PB.
- Pichi-Sermolli, Rudolfo E. G. "A provisional catalogue of the family names of living pteridophytes." Webbia 25: 219 - 297. 1970.
- Pichi-Sermolli, Rudolfo E. G. "Historical review of the higher classification of the Filicopsida." In Jermy, A.C., Crabb, J.A. & Thomas, B.A. eds, Phylogeny and Classification of the Ferns. Suppl. 1 Bot. J. Linn. Soc. 67: 11 - 40, f. 1 - 8, pl. 1 - 19. 1973.
- Pichi-Sermolli, Rudolfo E. G. "Tentamen pteridophytorum genera in taxanomicum ordinam redigendi." Webbia 31: 315 - 512. 1977.
