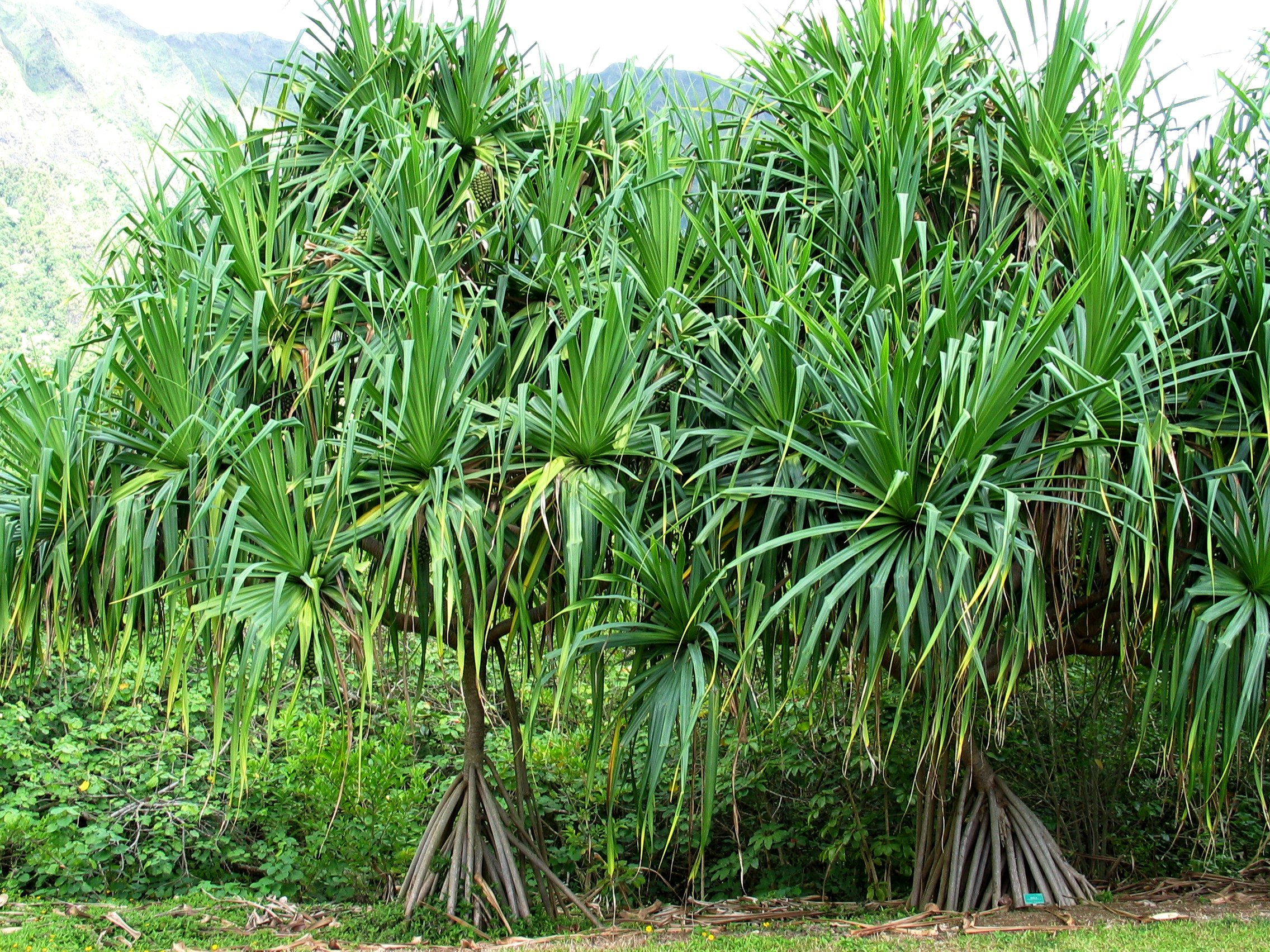
- Pandanus tectorius

Scientific classification
- Kingdom: Plantae
- Clade: Tracheophytes
- Clade: Angiosperms
- Clade: Monocots
- Order: Pandanales
- Family: Pandanaceae; R.Br.

Genera
- See text

= Pandanaceae =

Pandanaceae Temporal range: Late Cretaceous–Recent

Family of flowering plants

Pandanaceae is a family of flowering plants native to the tropics and subtropics of the Old World, from West Africa to the Pacific. It contains over 900 described species in five genera, of which the type genus, Pandanus, is the most important, with species like Pandanus amaryllifolius and karuka (Pandanus julianettii) being important sources of food. The family likely originated during the Late Cretaceous.

== Characteristics ==
Pandanaceae includes trees, shrubs and lianas, usually with sympodial branching. The stems bear prominent leaf scars and have adventitious roots which serve as prop roots or clasping roots. The leaves are spirally arranged, long and narrow, sheathing, undivided, longitudinally pleated and parallel-veined; the leaf margins and the underside of the midribs are often prickly, occasionally the upper side pleat ridges as well.

The plants are dioecious, meaning that male and female flowers are borne on separate plants. The inflorescences are generally terminal, sometimes axillary. They are racemes, spikes or umbels, with subtended spathes, which may be brightly colored. The flowers are minute and lack perianths. Male flowers contain numerous stamens with free or fused filaments. Female flowers have a superior ovary, usually of many carpels in a ring, but may be reduced to a row of carpels or a single carpel. Fruits are berries or drupes, usually multiple.

== Genera ==
Five genera are recognised – Plants of the World Online accepts a total of 934 species as of September 2026:

- Benstonea Callm. & Buerki – 58 spp.
- Freycinetia Gaudich. – 303 spp.
- Martellidendron (Pic.Serm.) Callm. & Chassot – 6 spp.
- Pandanus Parkinson – 565 spp.
- Sararanga Hemsl. – 2 spp.

Up until 2003, only three genera were recognised in the family: Pandanus, Freycinetia and Sararanga. In that year Callmander et al. published a paper in which the Pandanus subgenus Martellidendron was promoted to generic status based on the results of a DNA analysis of the family. Then in 2012, all of the species in Pandanus subgenus Acrostigma section Acrostigma, along with two more species placed elsewhere, were recognised as having a distinct morphology that separated them from the rest of Pandanus. Consequently, the new genus Benstonea was erected to accommodate them.

== Phylogeny ==
The phylogenic relationships of Pandanaceae genera.

- Pandanaceae
  - Sararanga
  - - Freycinetia
    - - Benstonea
      - - Martellidendron
        - Pandanus

== Uses ==
Particular species of Pandanus are used to make mats (e.g. Central Africa) or in food products (e.g. leaves as flavoring, or fruit in Southeast Asia).
