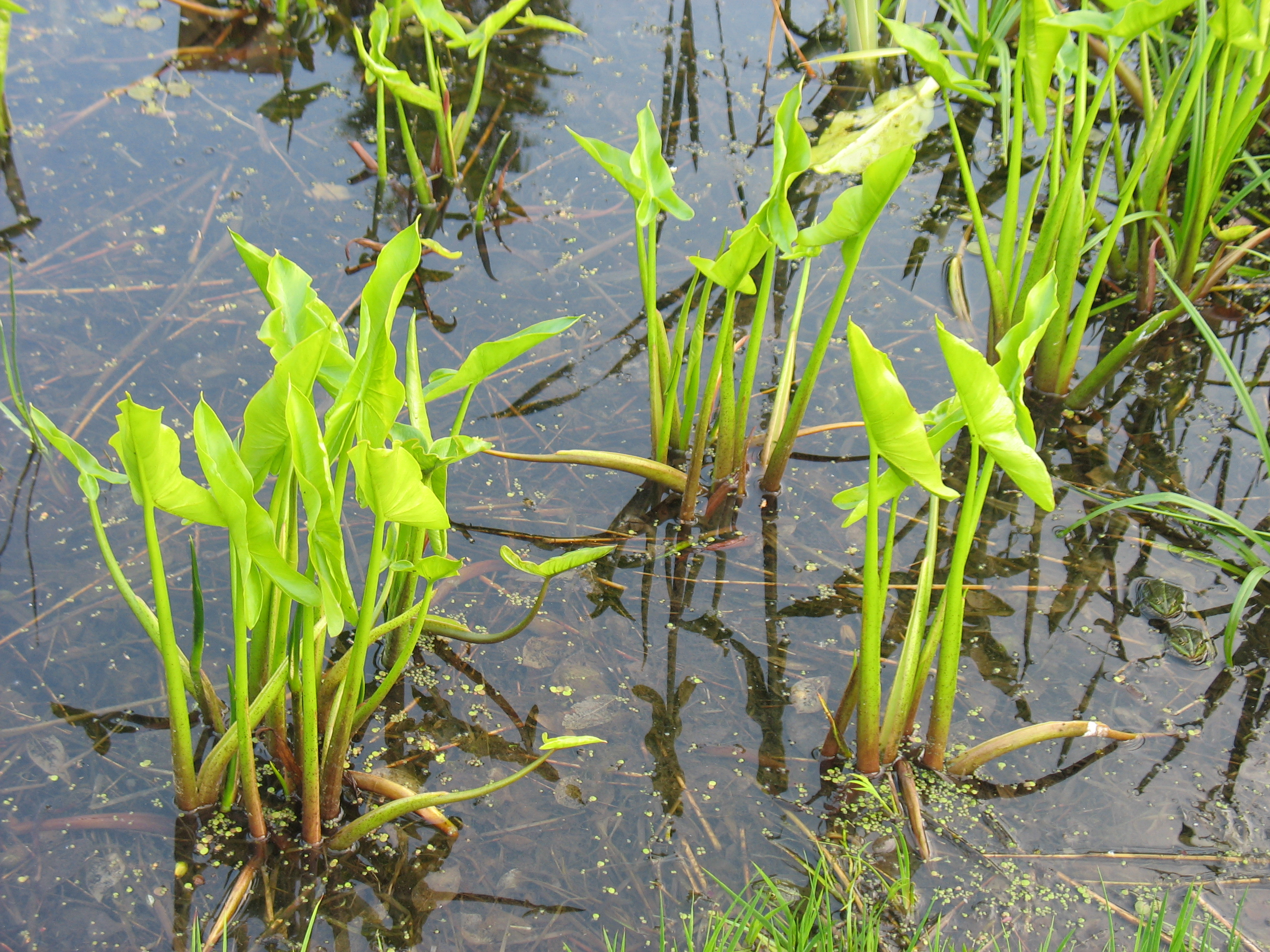

Conservation status
- Least Concern (IUCN 3.1)

Scientific classification
- Kingdom: Plantae
- Clade: Tracheophytes
- Clade: Angiosperms
- Clade: Monocots
- Order: Alismatales
- Family: Araceae
- Genus: Peltandra
- Species: P. virginica

Binomial name
- Peltandra virginica (L.) Schott
- Distribution of Peltandra virginica

Synonyms
- Arum virginicum L.; Calla virginica (L.) Michx.; Caladium virginicum (L.) Hook.; Lecontia virginica (L.) Torr.; Rensselaeria virginica (L.) L.C.Beck; Alocasia virginica (L.) Raf.; Peltandra undulata Raf.; Arum walteri Elliott; Peltandra undulata Schott; Peltandra angustifolia Raf.; Peltandra canadensis Raf.; Peltandra hastata Raf.; Peltandra walteri (Elliott) Raf.; Caladium undulatum Steud.; Peltandra tharpii F.A.Barkley; Peltandra luteospadix Fernald

= Peltandra virginica =

Species of aquatic plant

Peltandra virginica is a plant of the arum family known as green arrow arum and tuckahoe. It is widely distributed in wetlands in the eastern United States, as well as in Quebec, Ontario, and Cuba. It is common in central Florida including the Everglades and along the Gulf Coast. Its rhizomes are tolerant to low oxygen levels found in wetland soils.

P. virginica is a hydrophytic marshland aquatic plant pollinated by a chloropid fly through providing a brood site and releasing the pollen onto them. The primary dispersal mechanisms are via water and animals.

== Description ==
This is an emergent perennial herb growing from a large rhizome and producing many large leaves. An individual leaf may have a petiole nearly a meter long and a blade half a meter in length. The leaves are quite variable in shape and size, but they are often generally arrowhead-shaped.

The inflorescence bears male and female flowers, as well as sterile flowers. The flower varies from whitish to greenish to yellow. The fruit is a brown berry containing a few seeds within a clear gelatinous pulp. Large number of seeds can accumulate in the soil of wetlands.

Peltandra virginica is a marshland aquatic plant, growing in North America bogs, ponds, and marshes. The roots and base grow into the submerged substrate, and the leaves and inflorescences project up and out of the water. The roots form a perennial rhizome. Various forms of leaf blades have been observed, both in larger ranges and smaller individual populations. Petioles range from green to green-purple to purple with a medium green blade petiole lengths between 38 and 98 centimeters and blade length being between 9 and 57 centimeters. Lateral veins also have variable thicknesses. Inflorescences are generally pale green to white, being lighter within the spathe. Lengths for the inflorescence range between 7 and 25 centimeters with the spadix being about half the size to the full length of the spathe with greenish to white flowers, producing fruits that rot within the closed spathe. Fruits are pea green to mottled green and purple and range from 6 to 16 millimeters. In most of its range, it blooms from spring to late summer and fall and in warmer regions, it will bloom into the winter. It generally thrives in low salinity environments.

== Taxonomy ==
Arrow arum, Peltandra virginica, is a member of the arum family, Araceae, and is known by the names tuckahoe, green arrow arum, and peltandre. It was first identified as "tockowhough" by William Strachey, Secretary of the Colony of Virginia in 1611, in his book The Historie of Travaile Into Virginia Britannia. He describes its starchy root as a primary food source of the Powhatan Indians which they gathered from the marshes of Virginia. It was originally described as Arum virginicum by Carl Linnaeus in 1753 and has also been placed in the genera Alocasia, Caladium, Calla, Lecontia, and Rensselaeria. Other synonyms include Peltandra luteospadix and P. tharpii.

In the eastern United States and Canada where Peltandra virginica resides, one other Peltandra species exists, P. sagittifolia. P. virginica can be distinguished from the other extant taxon of Peltandra by the variation in leaf form, average greater size in non-reproductive structures, and the difference in color of the fruit. The fruit of P. sagittifolia is red with a white spathe, and the fruit of P. virginica are green to purple with a green to yellow green spathe.

== Distribution and habitat ==
Peltandra virginica is a native to North America; its range spans the entire eastern coast of the United States and goes as far west as Texas. It is also naturalized in areas of California up to Oregon and is present in eastern regions of Canada. It mostly inhabits the wetlands and swamps, including marshes and bogs.

It can be found elsewhere in North America as an introduced species and often an invasive plant.

== Conservation ==
Based on the Red List of Threatened Species 2016, P. virginica is a taxon of Least Concern, this is because of its broad range in eastern and central North America. In some areas within the range of P. virginica the populations are diminishing. It has also been found in California. While common in most of its range, P. virginica is listed as Endangered in Iowa.

== Pollination biology ==
In the pistillate stage the spadix of P. virginica is entirely covered by the spathe, not allowing insects to pollinate female flowers. Pollination is achieved by the plant's utilizing brood-site-based pollination. The chloropid fly Elachiptera formosa forms a symbiotic relationship with the inflorescence. The flies are attracted to the odor of the male flowers in an inflorescence's staminate stage where they feed on pollen and mate then find oviposition sites, followed by the development of the larvae and maturity of the flies.

== Ethnobotany ==
The plant contains calcium oxalate crystals, making it unpalatable. Indigenous peoples of the Americas used most parts of the plant for food, however, cooking it for hours first to make it safe to eat.

Historical accounts suggest that Native Americans may have used Peltandra virginica as a food source. They may have eaten the seeds and fruits as well as the leaves and roots. The section of P. virginica's range where its populations are highest, from Pennsylvania to coastal Virginia, are where it was most likely used for food. In other times and places, it has been used as an ornamental plant and to stabilize sediments in small bodies of water.

== Wildlife ==
Peltandra virginica is considered a low percentage of various animals' food sources. Peltandra virginica makes up 5–10% of the diet of small mammals that reside within its range and 10–25% of the diet of water birds that share its range.

== Toxicity ==
The non-reproductive structures of Peltandra virginica are known to contain calcium oxalate crystals, that can irritate the gastrointestinal system of animals and people and has been linked to the development of kidney stones.
