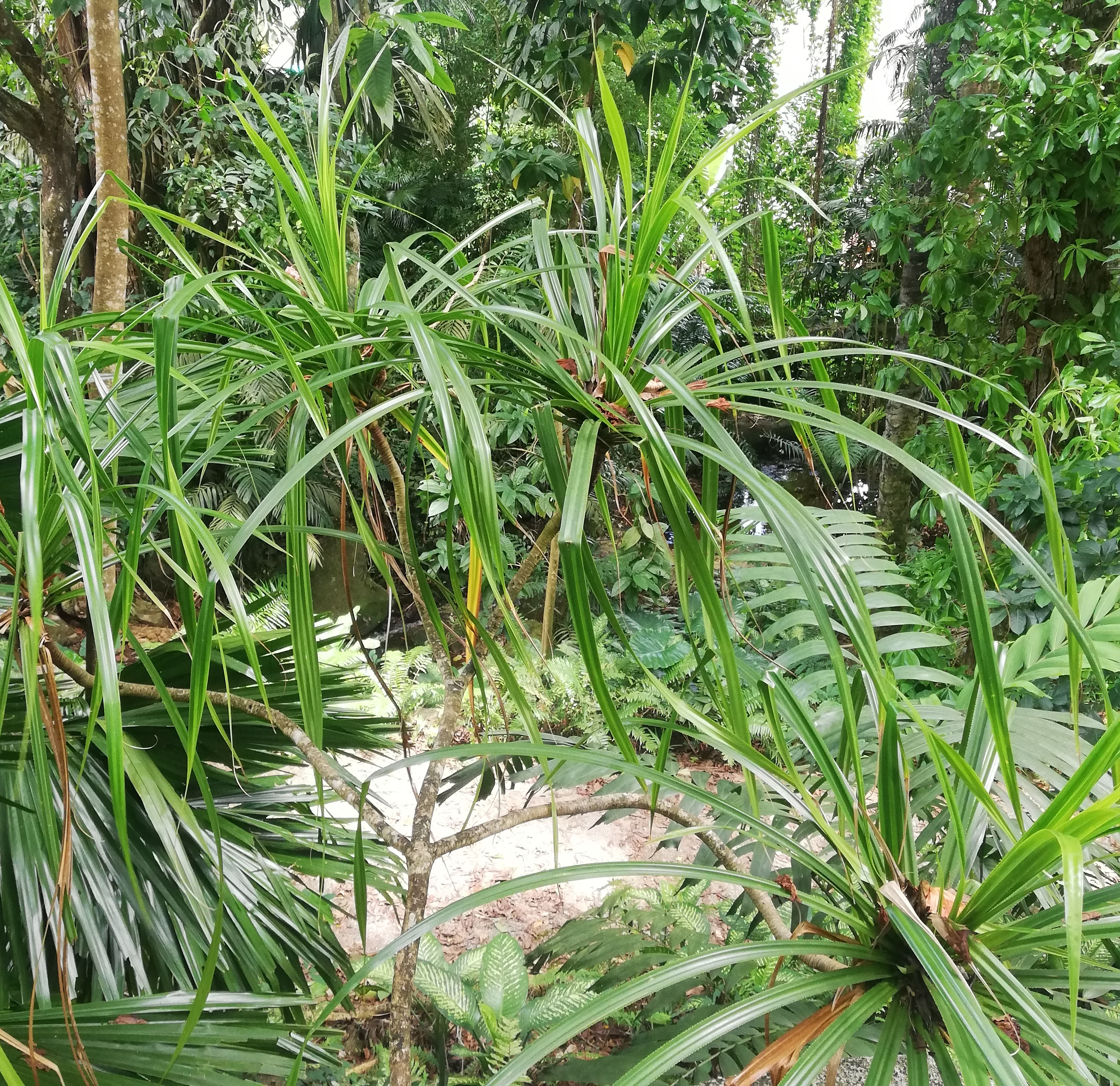
- Pandanus multispicatus is a slender, low-growing shrub.

Conservation status
- Near Threatened (IUCN 3.1)

Scientific classification
- Kingdom: Plantae
- Clade: Tracheophytes
- Clade: Angiosperms
- Clade: Monocots
- Order: Pandanales
- Family: Pandanaceae
- Genus: Pandanus
- Species: P. multispicatus

Binomial name
- Pandanus multispicatus Balf.f.

= Pandanus multispicatus =

Species of plant

Pandanus multispicatus (Vakwa de Montanny) is a species of plant in the family Pandanaceae, one of four species in this family that are endemic to the Seychelles.

== Description ==
This is the only Pandanus of Seychelles that does not become a tree, but rather grows as a low, sprawling shrub up to 4 m (13 ft) high, the thin stems often lying decumbent along the ground. The fruit bodies resemble corn cobs. Each contains 200-400 individual fruit segments, and several fruit bodies are born together on a stalk.

== Distribution and habitat ==
It grows mainly in rocky areas and was previously very common in the higher mountains of Seychelles (the reason for its local name, "Vakwa de Montanny"). Formerly widespread, it is currently restricted to only eight small and isolated populations.

Other indigenous Pandanaceae of the Seychelles include Martellidendron hornei, Pandanus sechellarum, and Pandanus balfourii. The Madagascan species Pandanus utilis is introduced and is now also widespread.
