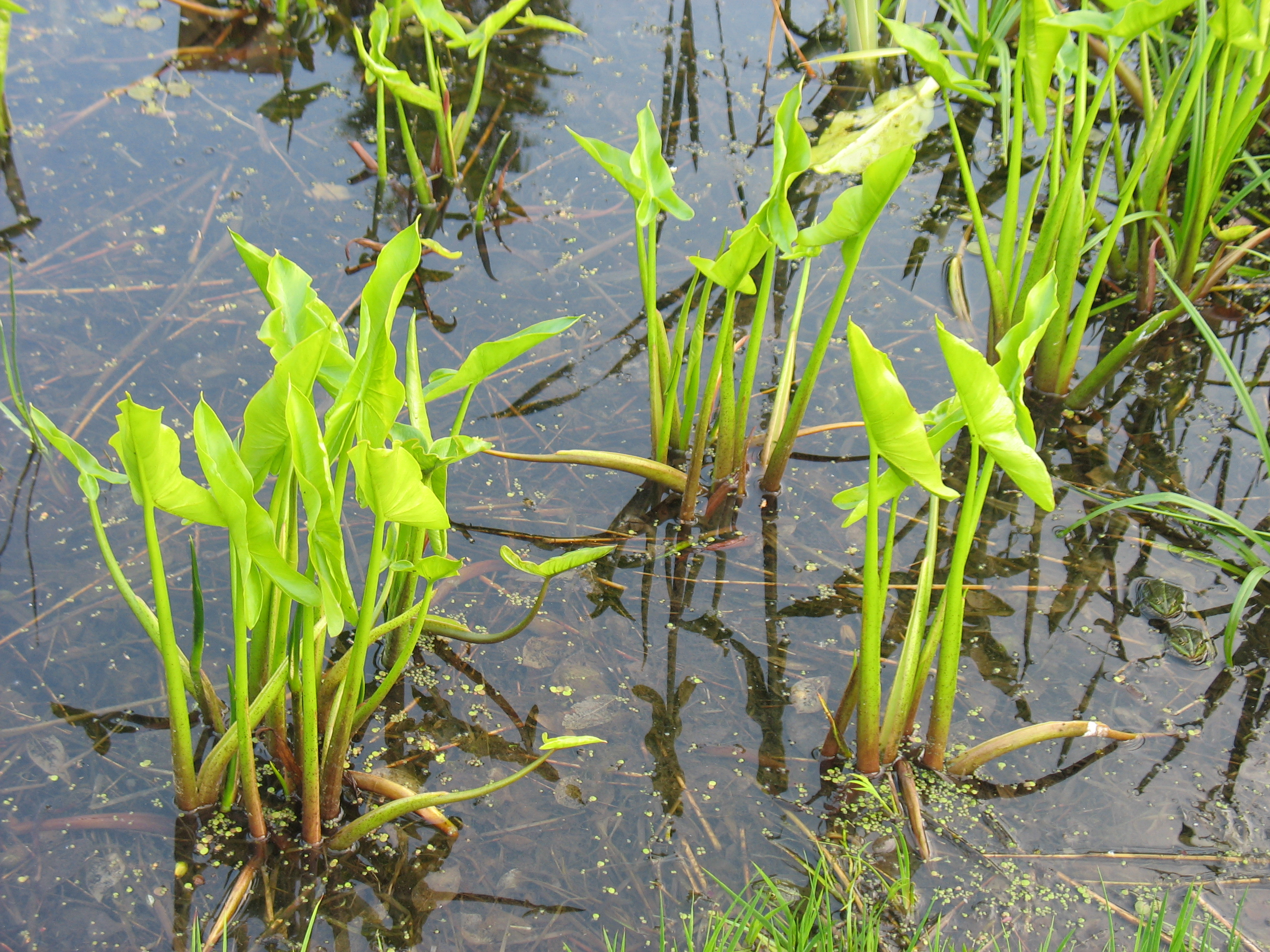
- Peltandra virginica cultivated in the botanical garden in Göttingen, Germany
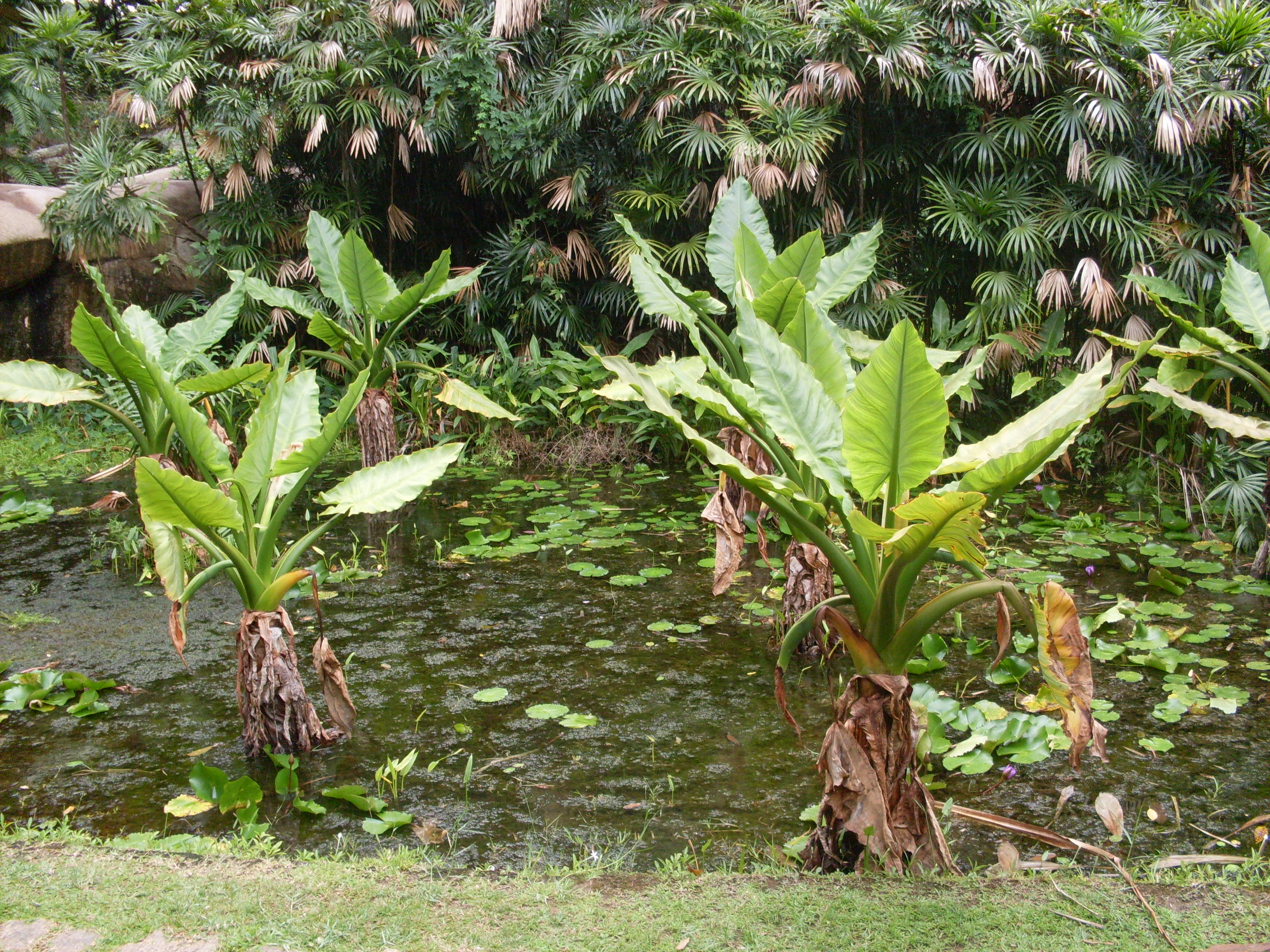
- Typhonodorum lindleyanum cultivated in the Victoria Botanical Garden, Seychelles

Scientific classification
- Kingdom: Plantae
- Clade: Tracheophytes
- Clade: Angiosperms
- Clade: Monocots
- Order: Alismatales
- Family: Araceae
- Subfamily: Aroideae
- Tribe: Peltandreae; Engl.

Type genus
- Peltandra Raf.

Genera
- Peltandra Raf.; Typhonodorum Schott

= Peltandreae =

Peltandreae Temporal range: 82.7 –0 Ma Late Cretaceous – Recent

Tribe of plants

Peltandreae is a tribe of plants in the arum family.

== Distribution ==
The distribution is disjunct. Peltandra is native to Eastern North America and the Caribbean (Canada, USA, Cuba) and Typhonodorum is native to Africa (the Comoros, Madagascar, Mauritius, Tanzania).

== Taxonomy ==
=== Taxonomic history ===
The tribe was first described in 1876 by the German botanist Heinrich Gustav Adolf Engler (Engl.). Engler placed Typhonodorum in a separate tribe Typhonodoreae. However, it is now included in Peltandreae.

=== Genera ===
Peltandreae consists of the following two genera:

- Peltandra Raf.
- Typhonodorum Schott

== Phylogeny ==
It is closely related to the European tribes Ambrosineae and Arisareae. These three tribes shared a common ancestor about 82.7 million years ago. 60 Million years old Peltandreae fossils have been found in Europe, North America, and Central Asia. Therefore, the group has existed for at least 60 Million years, as the evidence of the fossil record suggests, but the analysis of the molecular clock suggests this group is about 82.7 million years old.

The precise relationships are displayed in the following cladogram:

- - - Ambrosineae
      Ambrosina
    - Arisareae
      Arisarum
  - Peltandreae
    - Typhonodorum
    - Peltandra
