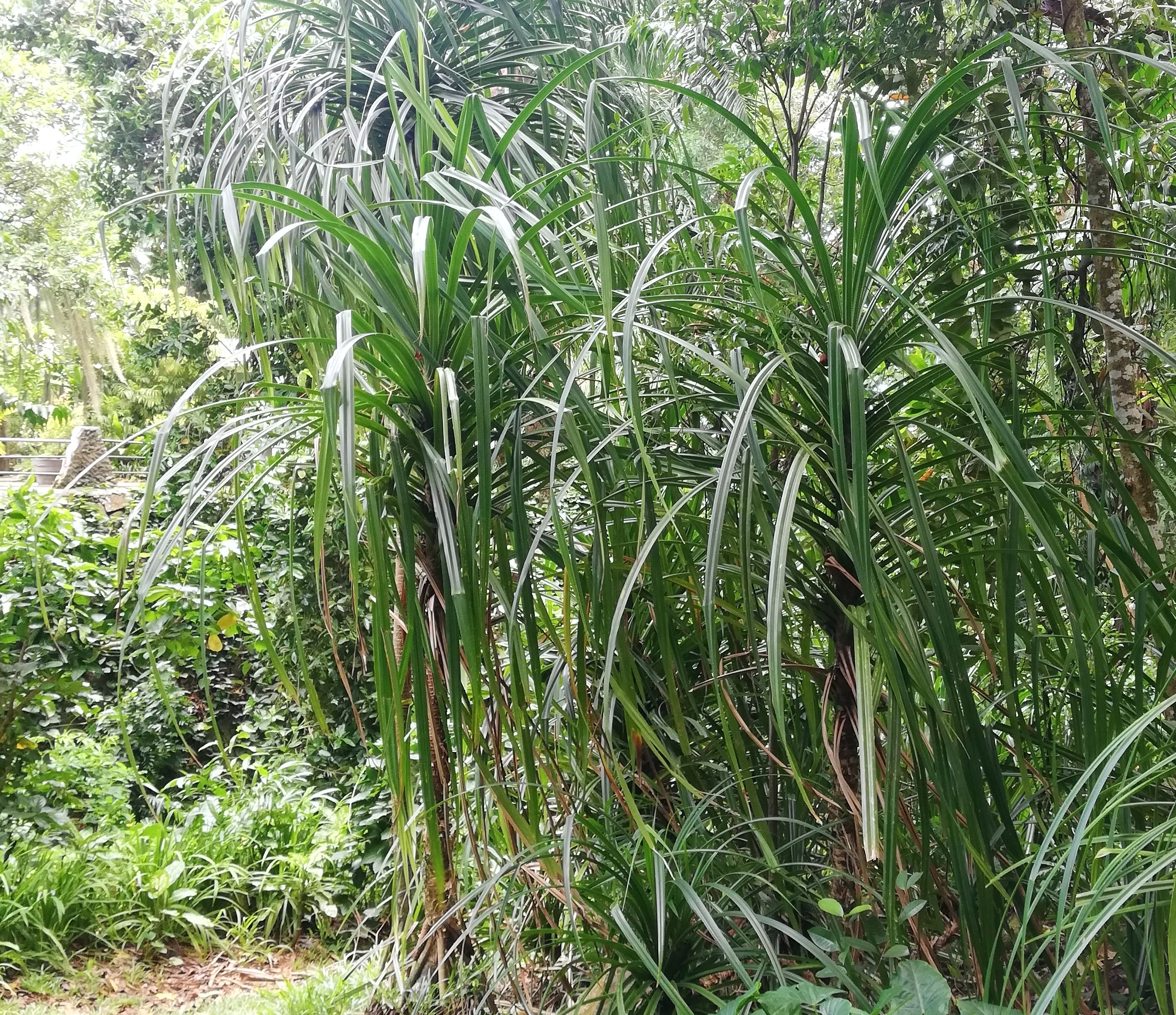
- Pandanus balfourii growing in the Seychelles Botanical Gardens

Conservation status
- Vulnerable (IUCN 3.1)

Scientific classification
- Kingdom: Plantae
- Clade: Tracheophytes
- Clade: Angiosperms
- Clade: Monocots
- Order: Pandanales
- Family: Pandanaceae
- Genus: Pandanus
- Species: P. balfourii

Binomial name
- Pandanus balfourii Martelli

= Pandanus balfourii =

Species of flowering plant

Pandanus balfourii, also known as Vakwa bordmer, is a species of plant in the family Pandanaceae, one of four species of the family that are endemic to the Seychelles.

== Description ==
Pandanus balfourii is a small, slender, elegant tree of about 8 m (26 ft) height, with small supporting roots, and bearing its drooping leaves in spiral rosettes. Its medium-sized (25 cm) fruit body hangs from the stem and contain 70-90 individual fruit.

== Distribution and habitat ==
It is endemic to the Seychelles, and was especially common on all the granitic islands. It was formerly extremely common along the coast, and its local name Vakwa bordmer refers to this habitat preference. However, it has been known to live in more rocky areas at higher altitudes too. It is threatened by habitat loss.

Other indigenous Pandanaceae of the Seychelles include Martellidendron hornei, Pandanus sechellarum, and Pandanus multispicatus. The Madagascan species Pandanus utilis is introduced and is now also widespread.

== Gallery ==
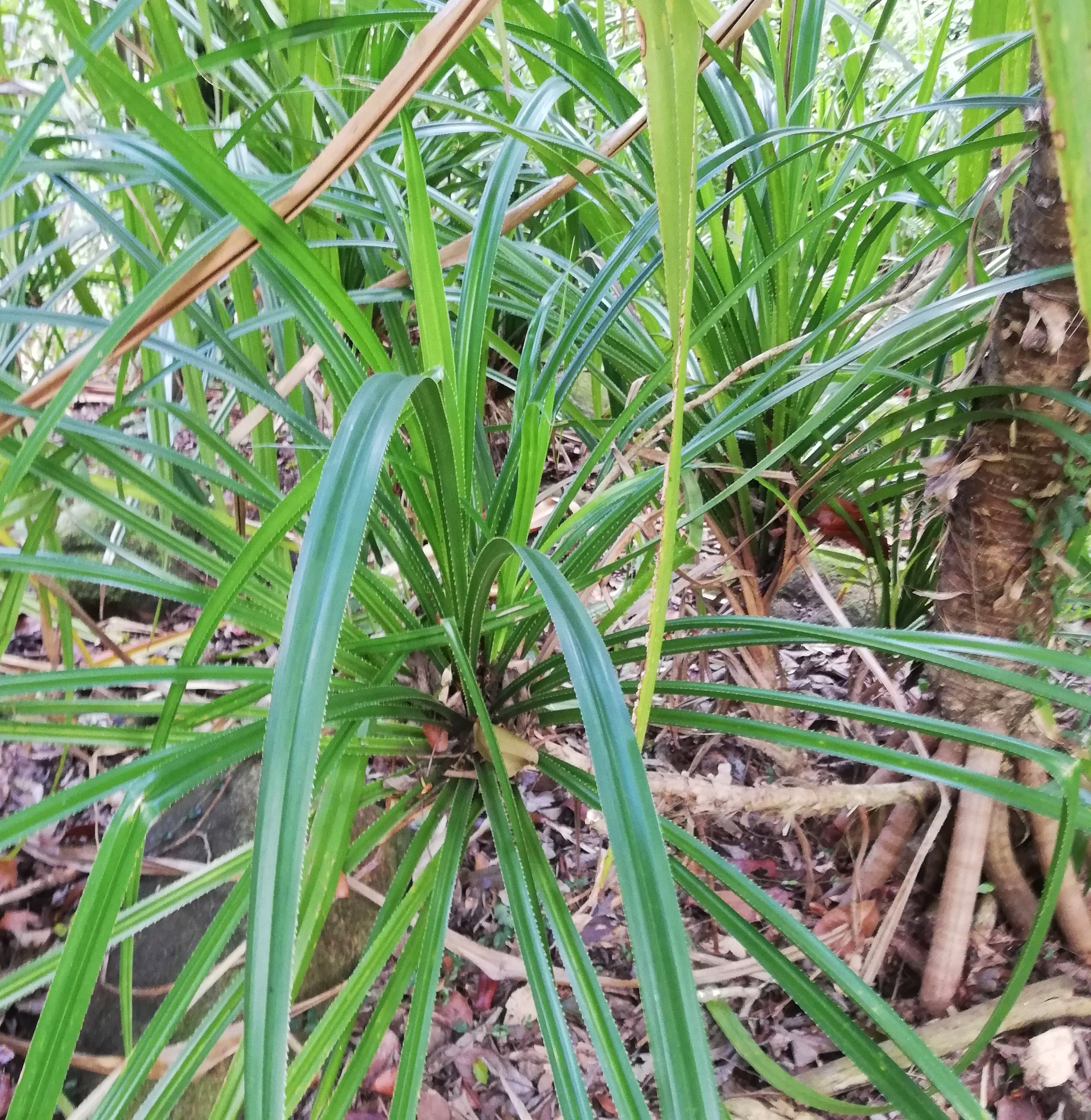
Detail of the rosette and drooping leaves of Pandanus balfourii.

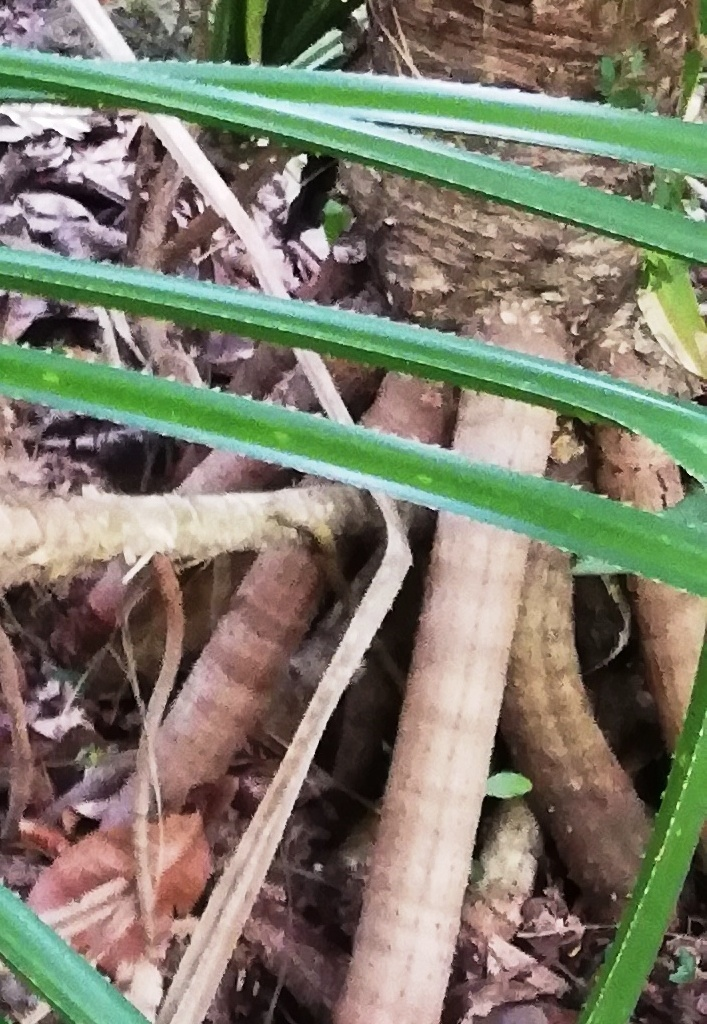
Detail of the small stilt-roots of Pandanus balfouri.
