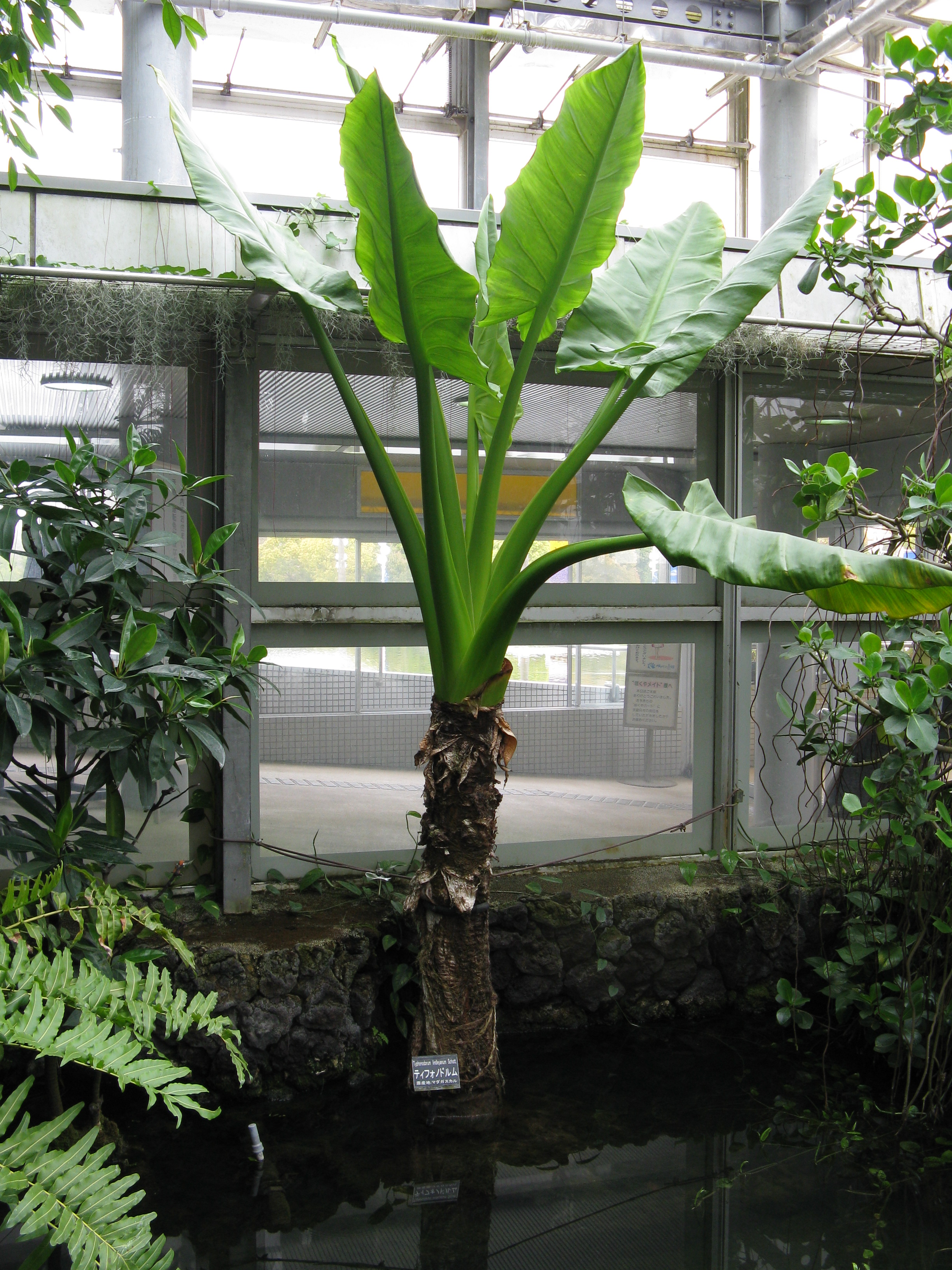

Scientific classification
- Kingdom: Plantae
- Clade: Embryophytes
- Clade: Tracheophytes
- Clade: Angiosperms
- Clade: Monocots
- Order: Alismatales
- Family: Araceae
- Subfamily: Aroideae
- Tribe: Peltandreae
- Genus: Typhonodorum; Schott
- Species: T. lindleyanum

Binomial name
- Typhonodorum lindleyanum Schott
- Range of the genus Typhonodorum.

Synonyms
- Arodendron Werth; Typhonodorum madagascariense Engl.; Arodendron engleri Werth

= Typhonodorum =

Genus of flowering plants

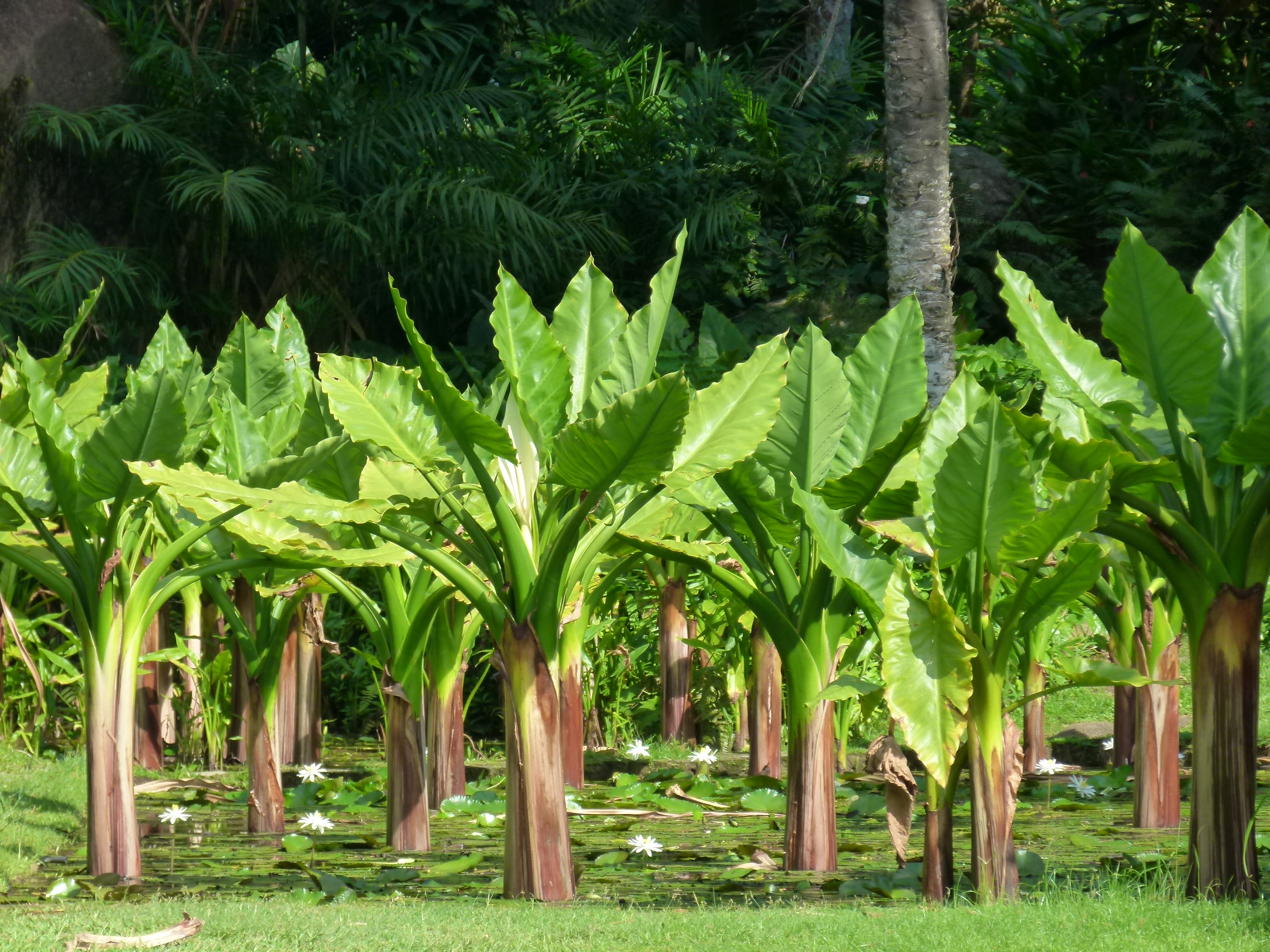
Typhonodorum lindleyanum, botanic garden on Mahé, Seychelles, March 2016.

Typhonodorum is a monotypic genus of flowering plants in the family Araceae. The single species making up this genus is Typhonodorum lindleyanum. The genus is native to Madagascar, the Comores, Zanzibar, Réunion and Mauritius. This genus is believed to be closely related to Peltandra even though Peltandra is only found in North America and there don't appear to exist closely related genera in the African mainland. There isn't fossil evidence to link the two genera so it has been proposed that there once was a genus in Africa from which the two genera had originated. The African mainland genus spread to North America and to Madagascar 50 million years ago before it broke off. Then the African genus became extinct and the North American and Madagascan genera remained.
