= Peltandra primaeva =

Peltandra primaeva Temporal range: Ypresian

Scientific classification
- Kingdom: Plantae
- Clade: Tracheophytes
- Clade: Angiosperms
- Clade: Monocots
- Order: Alismatales
- Family: Araceae
- Genus: Peltandra
- Species: †P. primaeva

Binomial name
- †Peltandra primaeva Hickey, 1977

Extinct species of flowering plant

Peltandra primaeva is an extinct species of monocot in the family Araceae known from a Ypresian age Eocene fossil found in western North Dakota, USA.

The species was described from a single leaf specimen found at the White Butte locality, USNM number 14048. This locality is placed in the Camels Butte member of the Golden Valley Formation. The Camels Butte member outcrops at a number of sites in western North Dakota, and is designated the type locality.

The holotype specimen, number USNM 43184, is preserved in the National Museum of Natural History collections of the Smithsonian Institution. The single specimen was studied by paleobotanist Leo J. Hickey of the Yale University Geology Department. Hickey published the 1977 type description for P. primaeva in the Geological Society of America memoir 150, Stratigraphy and Paleobotany of the Golden Valley Formation (Paleogene) of Western North Dakota. Hickey chose the specific name primaeva, noting the species to be the first and only megafossil record for the genus Peltandra described.

The holotype of Peltandra primaeva is a distal leaf portion displaying a short slightly pointed tip. The preserved section shows a distinct pattern of veins running parallel to the margin with reticulation in the veins forming abaxially. The only modern member of Araceae to show this structuring is Peltandra, hence the placement in the genus. Unlike the modern species P. primaeva, it has between eight and ten veins parallel to the margin and forms a 3.5 to 6 millimetres (0.14 to 0.24 in) costal zone which is larger than in modern species. The preservation of the fossil suggests the leaf would have been chartaeous, thin and paper-like, in life.
