= True Reportory =

1610 book by William Strachey

True Reportory is the short-title of a 24,000 word early American colonial narrative, A true reportory of the wracke, and redemption of Sir Thomas Gates Knight; vpon, and from the Ilands of the Bermudas: his comming to Virginia, and the estate of that Colonie then, and after, vnder the gouernment of the Lord La Warre, Iuly 15. 1610. The author William Strachey was a passenger on the Sea Venture, the flagship of the supply fleet that sailed to the English colony of Virginia from Plymouth in June 1609. During a hurricane it wrecked off the coast of Bermuda, where the survivors built two pinnaces, Patience and Deliverance, to continue the journey. They arrived in Jamestown in May 1610 and found the colony suffering from famine and Indian attacks that had reduced the 600 colonists to fewer than 70. True Reportory is Strachey's account of these incidents, first published in 1625 in an anthology of new world colonial literature assembled by Samuel Purchas.

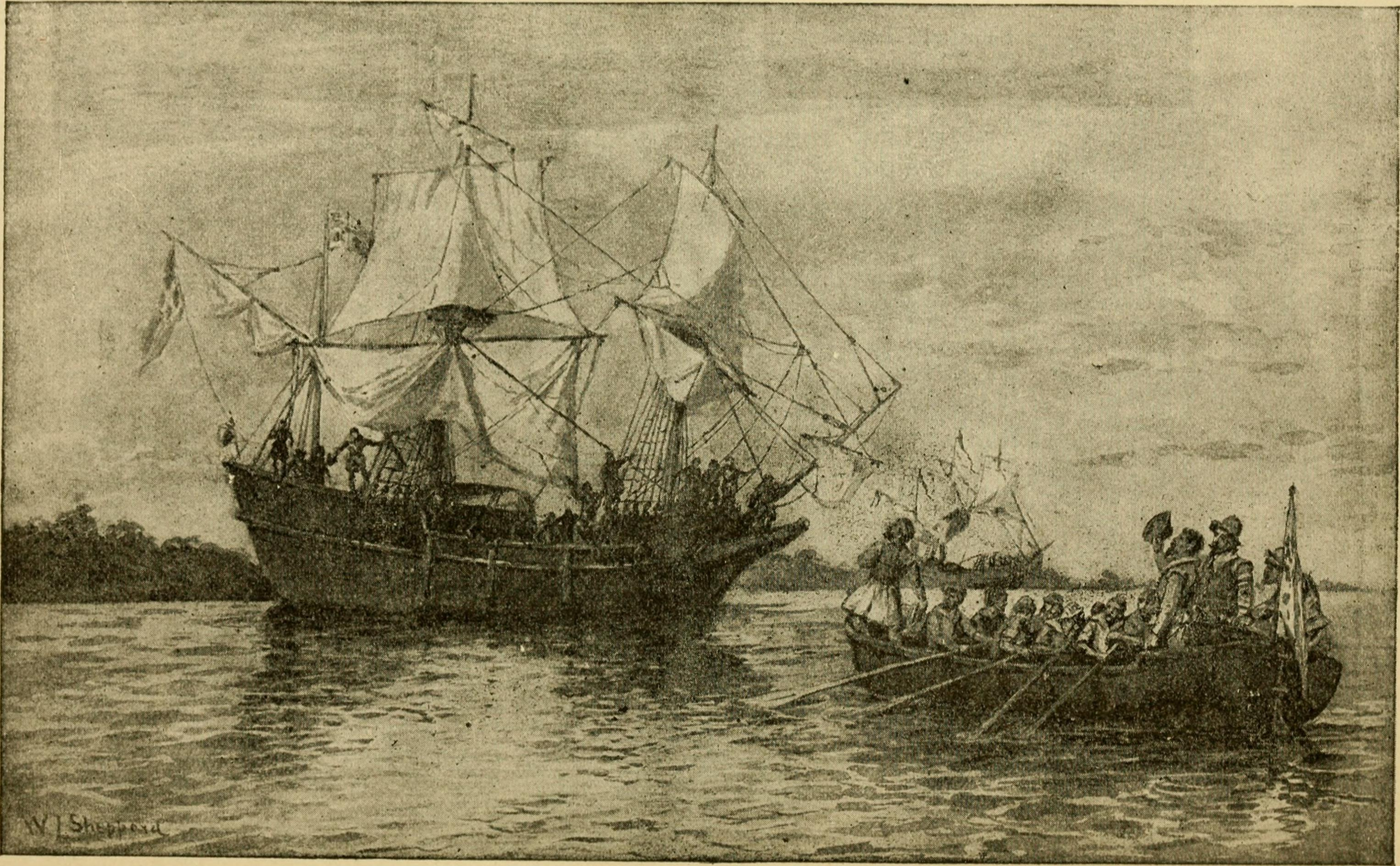
Lord De La Warr's flotilla intercepts the English refugees abandoning the Jamestown colony, June 1610

In 2001, Ivor Noël Hume published a much shorter and less literary version of the text transcribed from a manuscript discovered in Bermuda in 1983, which he suggests is a copy of a rough draft that was later revised by Strachey.

Aside from its historical and literary importance, Strachey's narrative has become a subject of scholarly debate because of its alleged influence on Shakespeare's The Tempest. Since the 19th century it has been generally accepted that one or more of the 1609 Bermuda shipwreck documents must have been a source for Shakespeare's play, and thus was used to establish a terminus a quo for its date of composition. In the 19th century Silvester Jourdain's pamphlet, A Discovery of The Barmudas (1609), was proposed as that source, but this was superseded in the early 20th century by the proposal that "True Reportory" was Shakespeare's source because of perceived parallels in language, incident, theme, and imagery. While this theory reflects the current scholarly consensus, it is not universally accepted; some scholars think it a probable but not proven source and some flatly oppose the claim.

== Bibliography ==
- Cawley, Robert R. "Shakespeare's Use of the Voyagers in The Tempest," PMLA 41 (1926), 688-726.
- Gayley, Charles Mills, Shakespeare and the Founders of Liberty in America, (1917).
- Hunter, Rev. Joseph. A Disquisition on the Scene, Origin, Date, etc. etc. of Shakespeare's Tempest (1839).
- Jourdan, Sylvester. A Discovery of the Barmudas, otherwise called the Ile of Divels. (1610). STC #14816. Reprinted A Voyage to Virginia in 1609, Louis B. Wright, ed. (1965), 105-116.
- Strachey, William. "The True Reportory of the Wracke and Redemption of Sir Thomas Gates" (f.p. 1625) in A Voyage to Virginia in 1609, Louis B. Wright, ed. (1965), 1-101.
- Vaughan, Alden. "William Strachey's 'True Reportory' and Shakespeare: a Closer Look at the Evidence" in Shakespeare Quarterly 59 (2008), 245-73.
- Woodward, Hobson. Brave Vessel: The True Tale of the Castaways Who Rescued Jamestown and Inspired Shakespeare's The Tempest. New York: Viking, 2009.
- Wright, Louis B. The Elizabethan's America: A Collection of Early Reports by Englishmen in the New World. Harvard University Press: Cambridge, MA. 1965.

== See also ==
- The Historie of Travaile Into Virginia Britannia
- The Generall Historie of Virginia, New-England, and the Summer Isles
