= Paleobotany =

Study of organic evolution of plants based on fossils

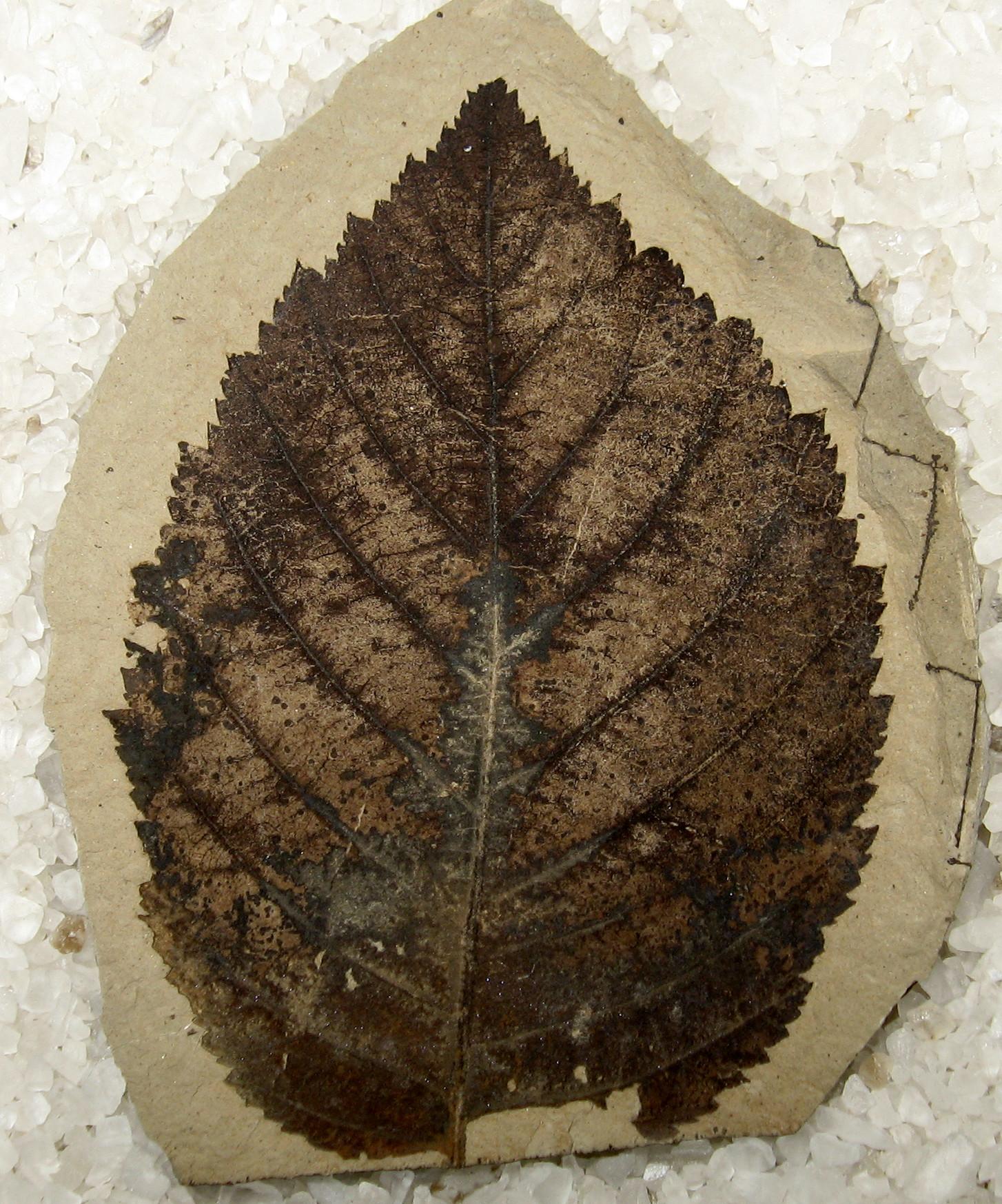
A fossil Betula leopoldae (birch) leaf from the Early Eocene of Washington state, approximately 49 million years ago

Paleobotany or palaeobotany, also known as paleophytology, is the branch of botany and paleontology dealing with the recovery and identification of plant fossils from geological contexts, and their use for the biological reconstruction of past environments (paleogeography), and the evolutionary history of plants, with a bearing upon the evolution of life in general. It is a component of palaeontology and paleobiology. The prefix palaeo- or paleo- means "ancient, old", and is derived from the Greek adjective παλαιός, palaios. Paleobotany includes the study of land plants, as well as the study of prehistoric marine photoautotrophs such as photosynthetic algae, seaweeds or kelp. A closely related field is palynology, which is the study of fossilized and extant spores and pollen.

Paleobotany is important in the reconstruction of ancient ecological and climate systems, known as paleoecology and paleoclimatology respectively. It is fundamental to the study of green plant development and evolution. Paleobotany is a historical science much like its adjacent, palaeontology. Because of the understanding that paleobotany gives to paleontologists, it has become important to the field of paleonthology as a whole. primarily for the use of phytoliths in relative dating and in paleoethnobotany.

The study and discipline of paleobotany have been recognised as far back as the 19th century. Known as the "Father of Palaeobotany", French botanist Adolphe-Théodore Brongniart was a significant figure in the emergence of paleobotany, known for his work on the relationship between the living and extinct plant life. This work not only progressed paleobotany but also the understanding of the Earth and its longevity in actuality and the organic matter that existed over the Earth's timeline. Paleobotany also succeeded in the hands of German palaeontologist Ernst Friedrich von Schlothiem, and Czech nobleman and scholar, Kaspar Maria von Sternberg.

== Related sciences ==
=== Paleoecology ===
As paleobotany is the specification of fossilized plant life and the environment in which they thrived in, paleoecology is the study of all once-living organisms and the interactions held in the environments they once existed in, before becoming extinct.

Paleoecology is a similar study to that of palaeontology, but paleoecology uses more methodology from the biological sciences and geological sciences rather than from an anthropological standpoint as palaeontologists do.

=== Paleopalynology ===
Paleopalynology, more commonly known as palynology, is the science and study of ancient palynomorphs: particles sized between 5 and 500 micrometres. This would be an inclusion of pollen and spores and any other micro-organic matter. Paleopalynology is simply paleobotany on a much smaller scale, the two in close association with each other.

Similar to paleobotany, paleopalynology can uncover information about what the environment and biome was like at the time these particles existed prehistorically. Palynomorphs are used by geologists to identify and date the rock strata of sedimentary rocks, and find natural oils and gas within these rock layers for extraction. Other uses of palynology include researching animal diets, historical standings of human allergies, and revealing evidence in crime cases.

== Overview of the paleobotanical record ==
Macroscopic remains of true vascular plants are first found in the fossil record during the Silurian Period of the Paleozoic era. Some dispersed, fragmentary fossils of disputed affinity, primarily spores and cuticles, have been found in rocks from the Ordovician Period in Oman, and are thought to derive from liverwort- or moss-grade fossil plants.

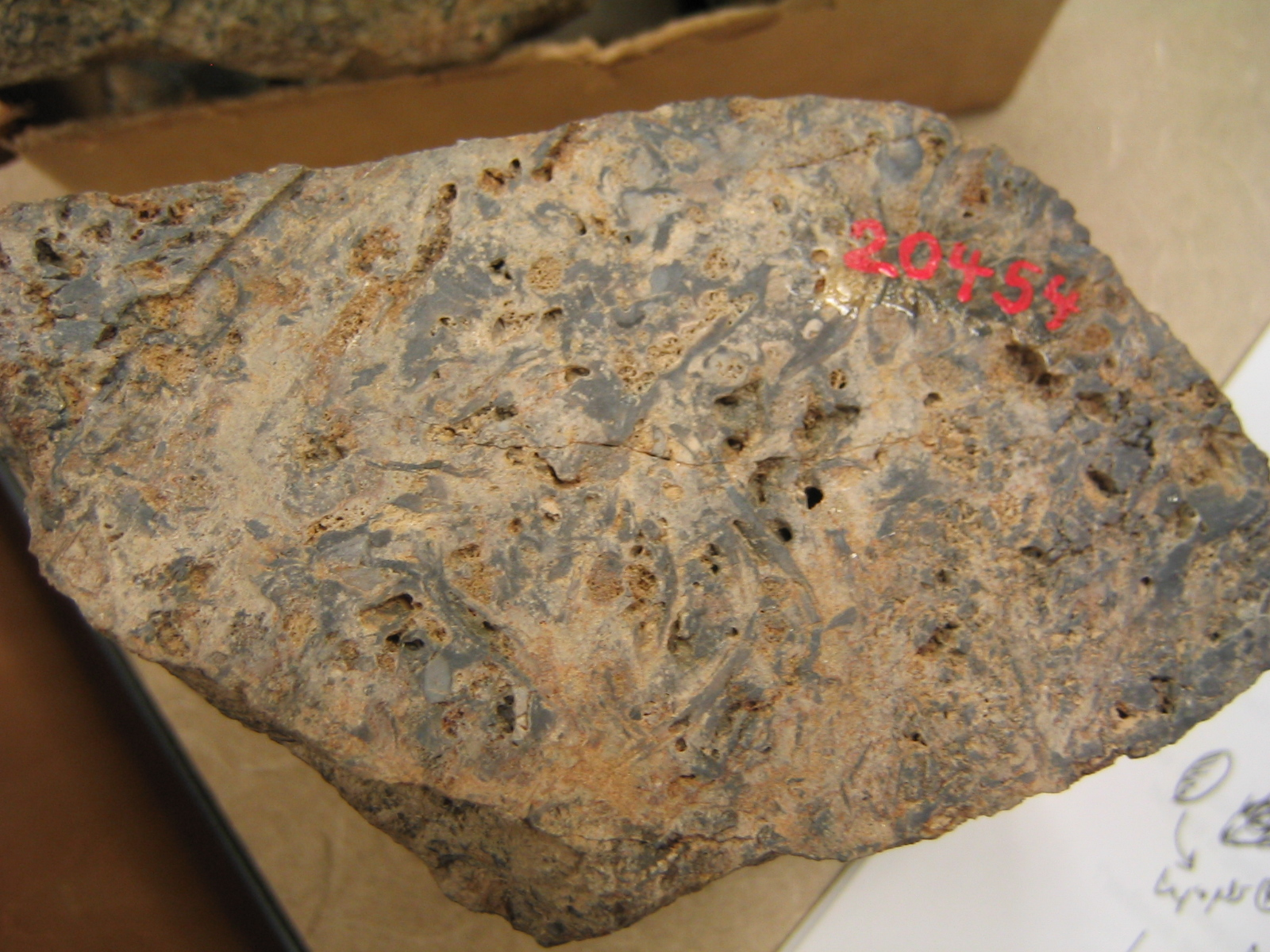
An unpolished hand sample of the Lower Devonian Rhynie Chert from Scotland

An important early land plant fossil locality is the Rhynie chert, found outside the village of Rhynie in Scotland. The Rhynie chert is an Early Devonian sinter (hot spring) deposit composed primarily of silica. It is exceptional due to its preservation of several different clades of plants, from mosses and lycophytes to more unusual, problematic forms. Many fossil animals, including arthropods and arachnids, are also found in the Rhynie chert, and it offers a unique window into the history of early terrestrial life.

Plant-derived macrofossils become abundant in the Late Devonian including tree trunks, fronds, and roots. The earliest tree was once thought to be Archaeopteris, which bears simple, fern-like leaves spirally arranged on branches atop a conifer-like trunk, although it is now known to be the recently discovered Wattieza.

Widespread coal swamp deposits across North America and Europe during the Carboniferous Period contain a wealth of fossils containing arborescent lycopods up to 30 m tall, abundant seed plants, such as conifers and seed ferns, and countless smaller, herbaceous plants.

Angiosperms (flowering plants) evolved during the Mesozoic, and flowering plant pollen and leaves first appeared during the Early Cretaceous, approximately 130 million years ago.

== Plant fossils ==
A plant fossil is any preserved part of a plant that has long since died. Such fossils may be prehistoric impressions that are many millions of years old, or bits of charcoal that are only a few hundred years old. Prehistoric plants are various groups of plants that lived before recorded history (before about 3500 BC).

=== Preservation of plant fossils ===
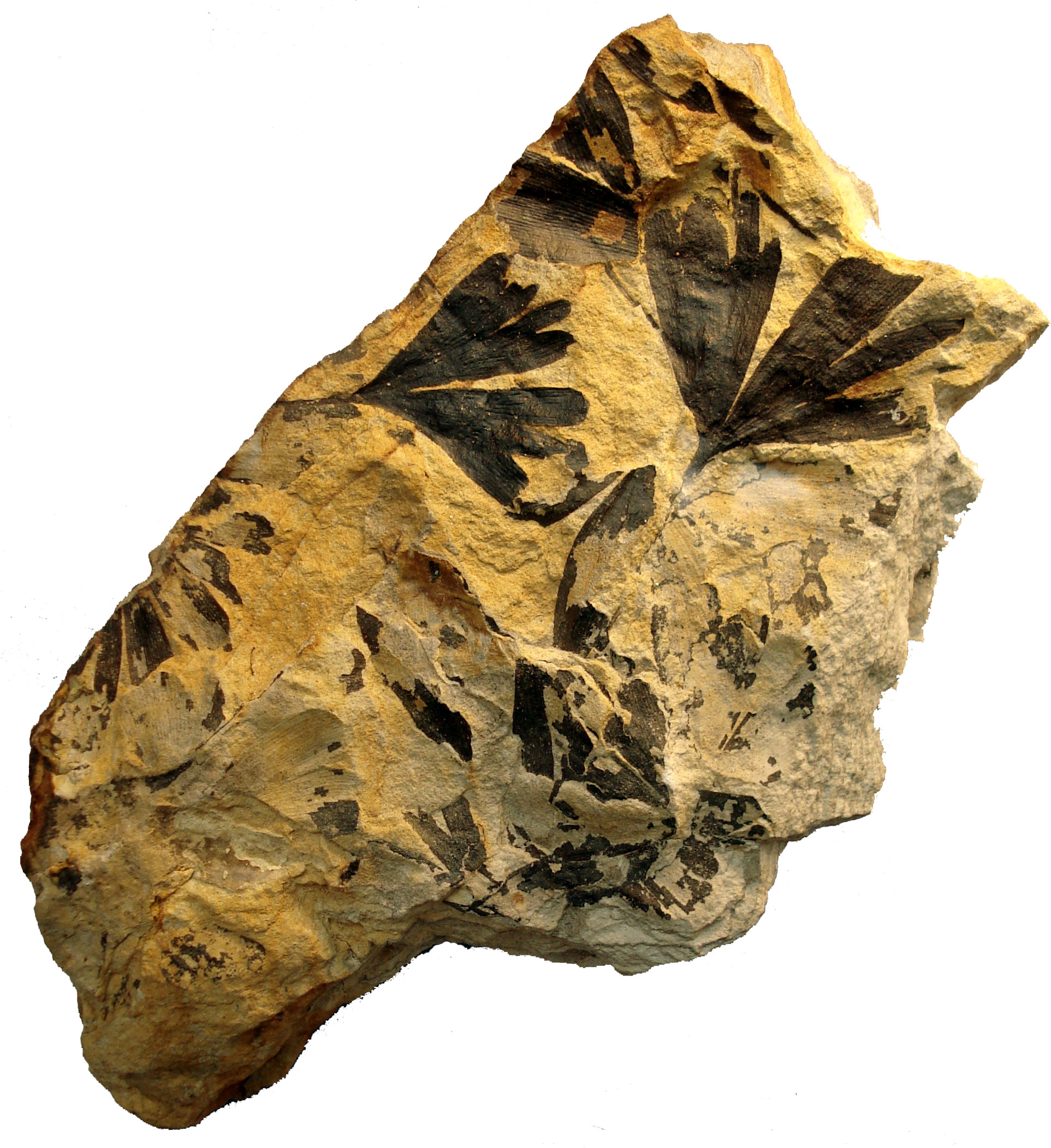
Ginkgoites huttonii, Middle Jurassic, Yorkshire, UK. Leaves preserved as compressions. Specimen in Munich Palaeontological Museum, Germany.

Plant fossils can be preserved in a variety of ways, each of which can give different types of information about the original parent plant. These modes of preservation may be summarised in a paleobotanical context as follows:

1. Adpressions (compressions – impressions). These are the most commonly found type of plant fossil. They provide good morphological detail, especially of dorsiventral (flattened) plant parts such as leaves. If the cuticle is preserved, they can also yield fine anatomical detail of the epidermis. Little other detail of cellular anatomy is normally preserved.
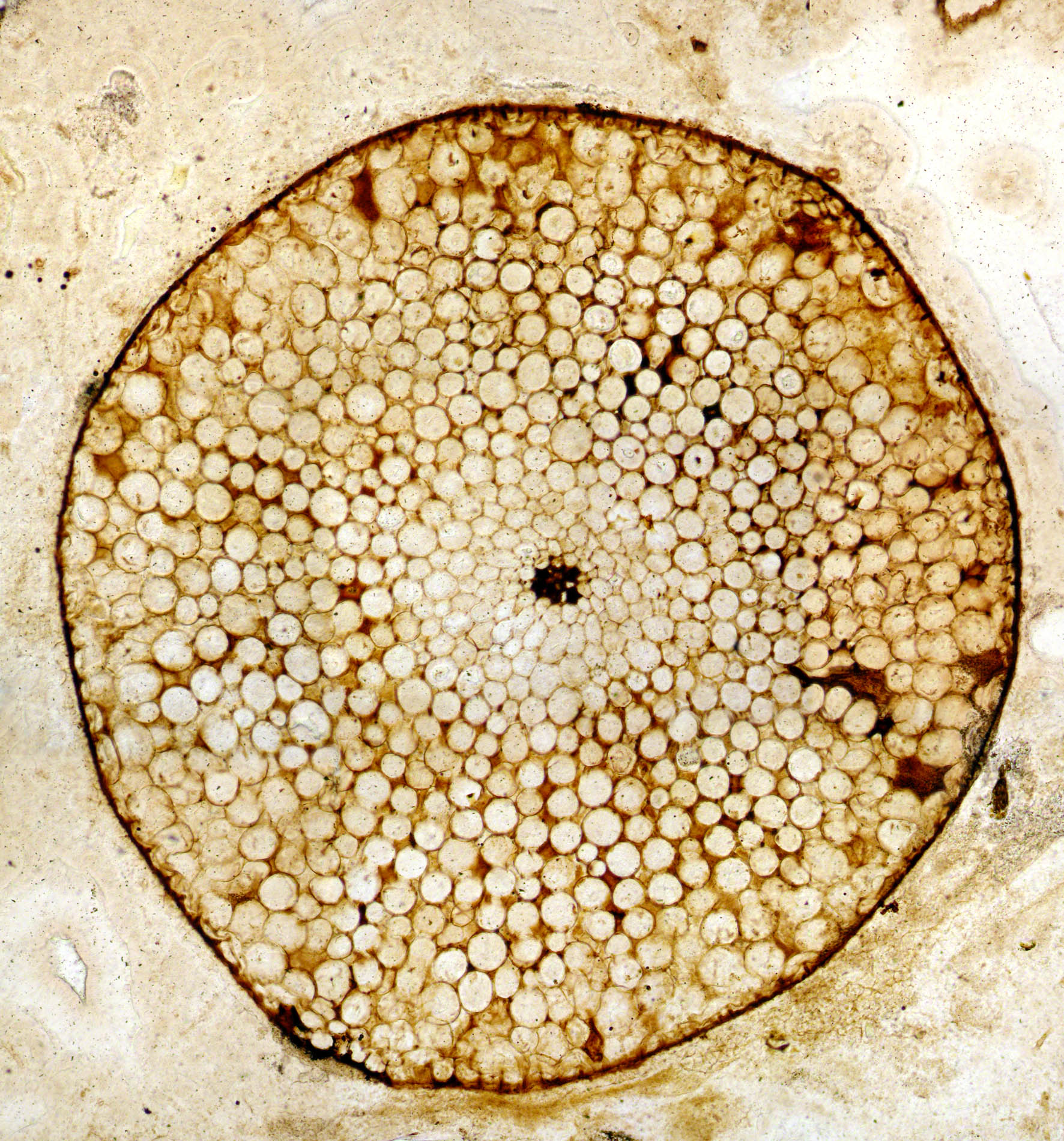
  Rhynia, Lower Devonian Rhynie Chert, Scotland, UK. Transverse section through a stem preserved as a silica petrifaction, showing preservation of cellular structure.
2. Petrifactions (permineralisations or anatomically preserved fossils). These provide fine detail of the cell anatomy of the plant tissue. Morphological detail can also be determined by serial sectioning, but this is both time consuming and difficult.
3. Moulds and casts. These only tend to preserve the more robust plant parts such as seeds or woody stems. They can provide information about the three-dimensional form of the plant, and in the case of casts of tree stumps can provide evidence of the density of the original vegetation. However, they rarely preserve any fine morphological detail or cell anatomy. A subset of such fossils are pith casts, where the centre of a stem is either hollow or has delicate pith. After death, sediment enters and forms a cast of the central cavity of the stem. The best known examples of pith casts are in the Carboniferous Sphenophyta (Calamites) and cordaites (Artisia).
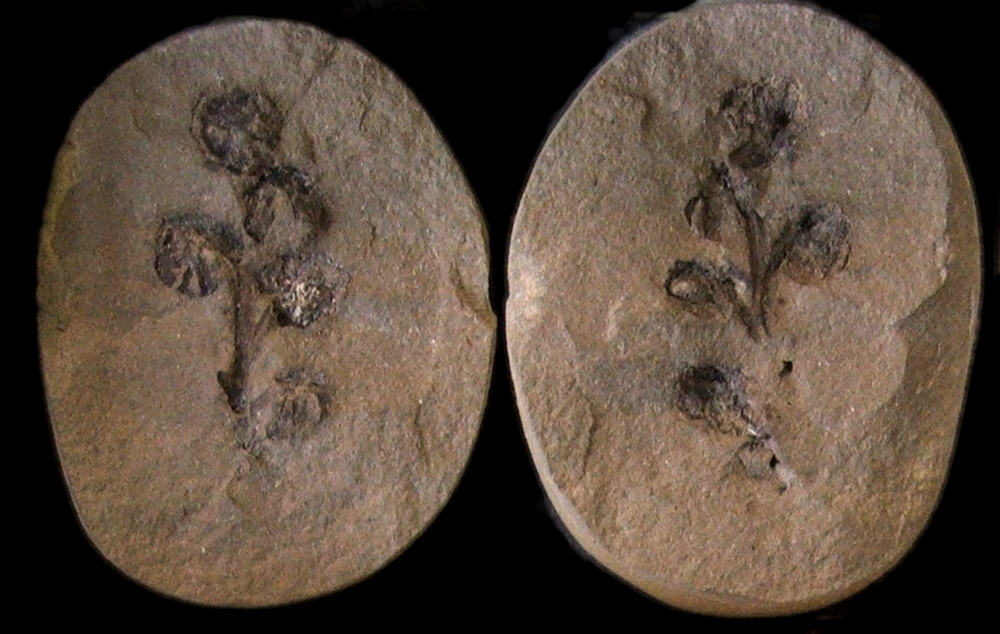
  Crossotheca hughesiana Kidston, Middle Pennsylvanian, Coseley, near Dudley, UK. A lyginopteridalean pollen organ preserved as an authigenic mineralization (mineralized in situ). Specimen in Sedgwick Museum, Cambridge, UK.
4. Authigenic mineralisations. These can provide very fine, three-dimensional morphological detail, and have proved especially important in the study of reproductive structures that can be severely distorted in adpressions. However, as they are formed in mineral nodules, such fossils can rarely be of large size.
5. Fusain. Fire normally destroys plant tissue but sometimes charcoalified remains can preserve fine morphological detail that is lost in other modes of preservation; some of the best evidence of early flowers has been preserved in fusain. Fusain fossils are delicate and often small, but because of their buoyancy can often drift for long distances and can thus provide evidence of vegetation away from areas of sedimentation.

=== Fossil-taxa ===
Plant fossils almost always represent disarticulated parts of plants; even small herbaceous plants are rarely preserved whole. The few examples of plant fossils that appear to be the remains of whole plants are in fact incomplete as the internal cellular tissue and fine micromorphological detail is normally lost during fossilization. Plant remains can be preserved in a variety of ways, each revealing different features of the original parent plant.

Because of this, paleobotanists usually assign different taxonomic names to different parts of the plant in different modes of preservation. For instance, in the subarborescent Palaeozoic sphenophytes, an impression of a leaf might be assigned to the genus Annularia, a compression of a cone assigned to Palaeostachya, and the stem assigned to either Calamites or Arthroxylon depending on whether it is preserved as a cast or a petrifaction. All of these fossils may have originated from the same parent plant but they are each given their own taxonomic name. This approach to naming plant fossils originated with the work of Adolphe-Théodore Brongniart.

For many years this approach to naming plant fossils was accepted by paleobotanists but not formalised within the International Rules of Botanical Nomenclature. Eventually, Thomas (1935) and Jongmans, Halle & Gothan (1935) proposed a set of formal provisions, the essence of which was introduced into the 1952 International Code of Botanical Nomenclature. These early provisions allowed fossils representing particular parts of plants in a particular state of preservation to be placed in organ-genera. In addition, a small subset of organ-genera, to be known as form-genera, were recognised based on the artificial taxa introduced by Brongniart mainly for foliage fossils. The concepts and regulations surrounding organ- and form-genera were modified within successive codes of nomenclature, reflecting a failure of the paleobotanical community to agree on how this aspect of plant taxonomic nomenclature should work (a history reviewed by Cleal and Thomas in 2020). The use of organ- and fossil-genera was abandoned with the St Louis Code, and replaced by "morphotaxa".

The situation in the Vienna Code of 2005 was that any plant taxon whose type is a fossil, except diatoms, can be described as a morphotaxon, a particular part of a plant preserved in a particular way. Although the name is always fixed to the type specimen, the circumscription (i.e. range of specimens that may be included within the taxon) is defined by the taxonomist who uses the name. Such a change in circumscription could result in an expansion of the range of plant parts or preservation states that could be incorporated within the taxon. For instance, a fossil-genus originally based on compressions of ovules could be used to include the multi-ovulate cupules within which the ovules were originally borne. A complication can arise if, in this case, there was an already named fossil-genus for these cupules. If paleobotanists were confident that the type of the ovule fossil-genus and of the cupule fossil-genus could be included in the same genus, then the two names would compete as to being the correct one for the newly emended genus. In general, there would be competing priority whenever plant parts that had been given different names were discovered to belong to the same species. It appeared that morphotaxa offered no real advantage to paleobotanists over normal fossil-taxa and the concept was abandoned with the 2011 botanical congress and the 2012 International Code of Nomenclature for algae, fungi, and plants.

== Fossil groups of plants ==
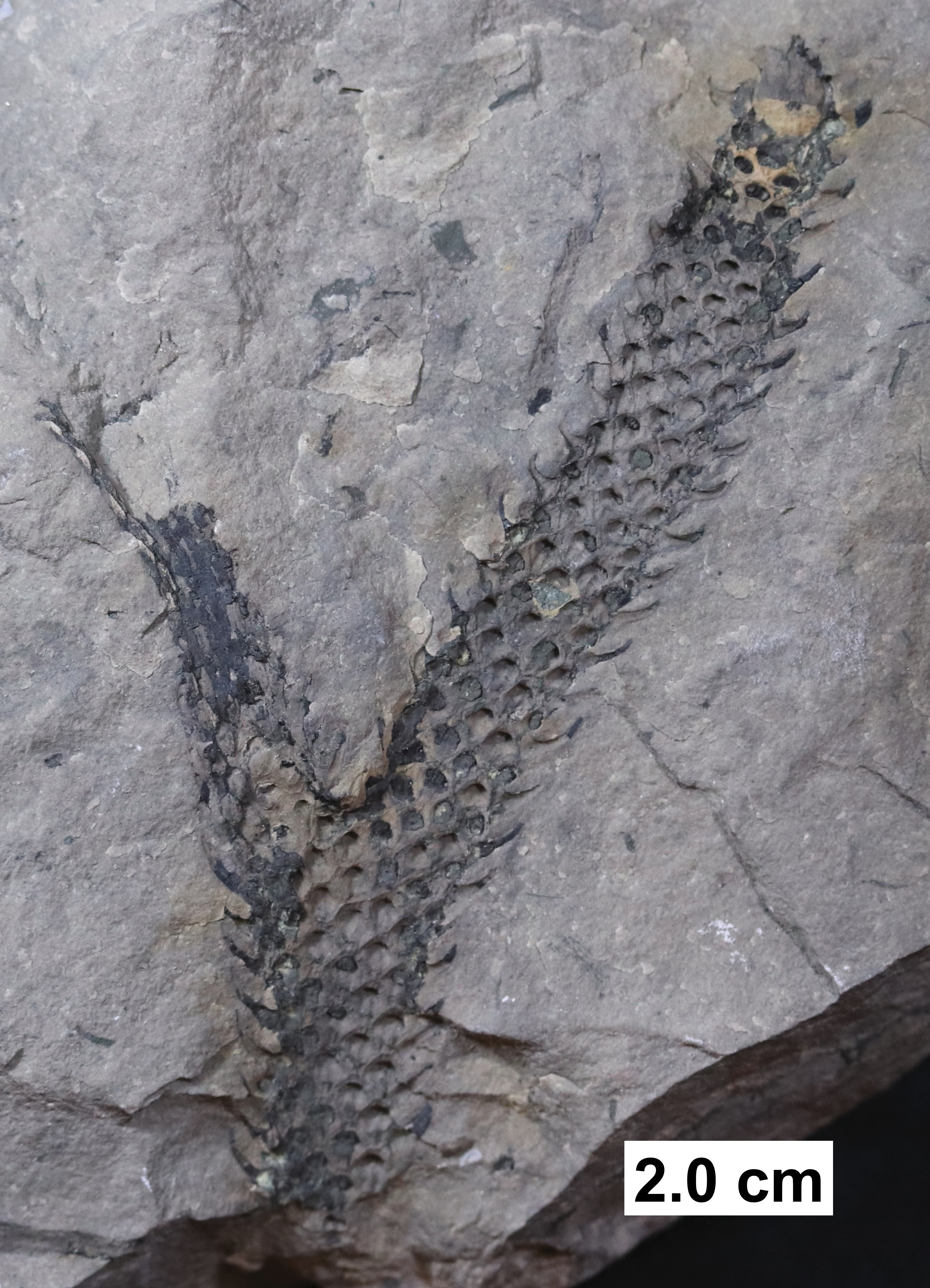
Lycopod axis (branch) from the Middle Devonian of Wisconsin.

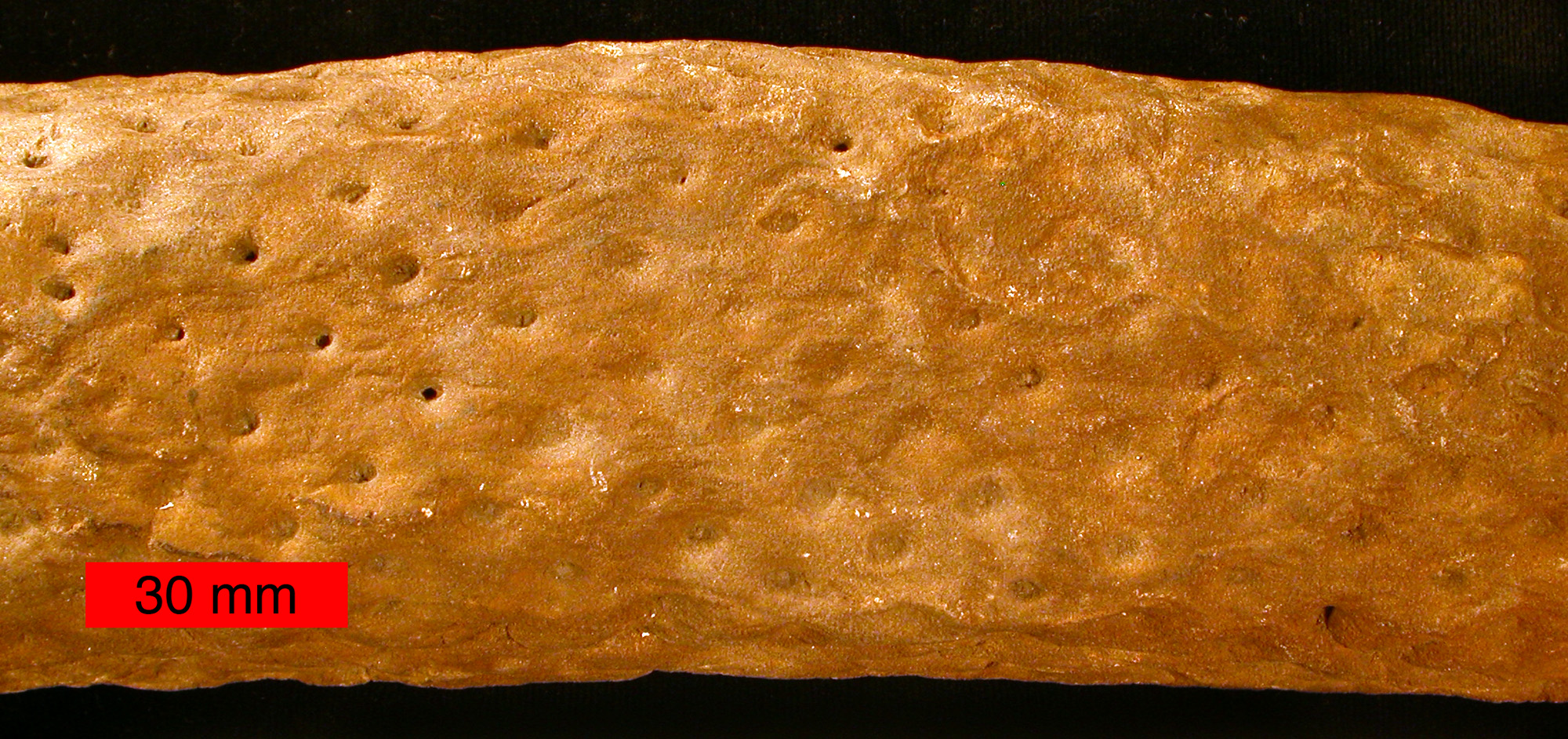
Stigmaria, a common fossil tree root. Upper Carboniferous of northeastern Ohio.

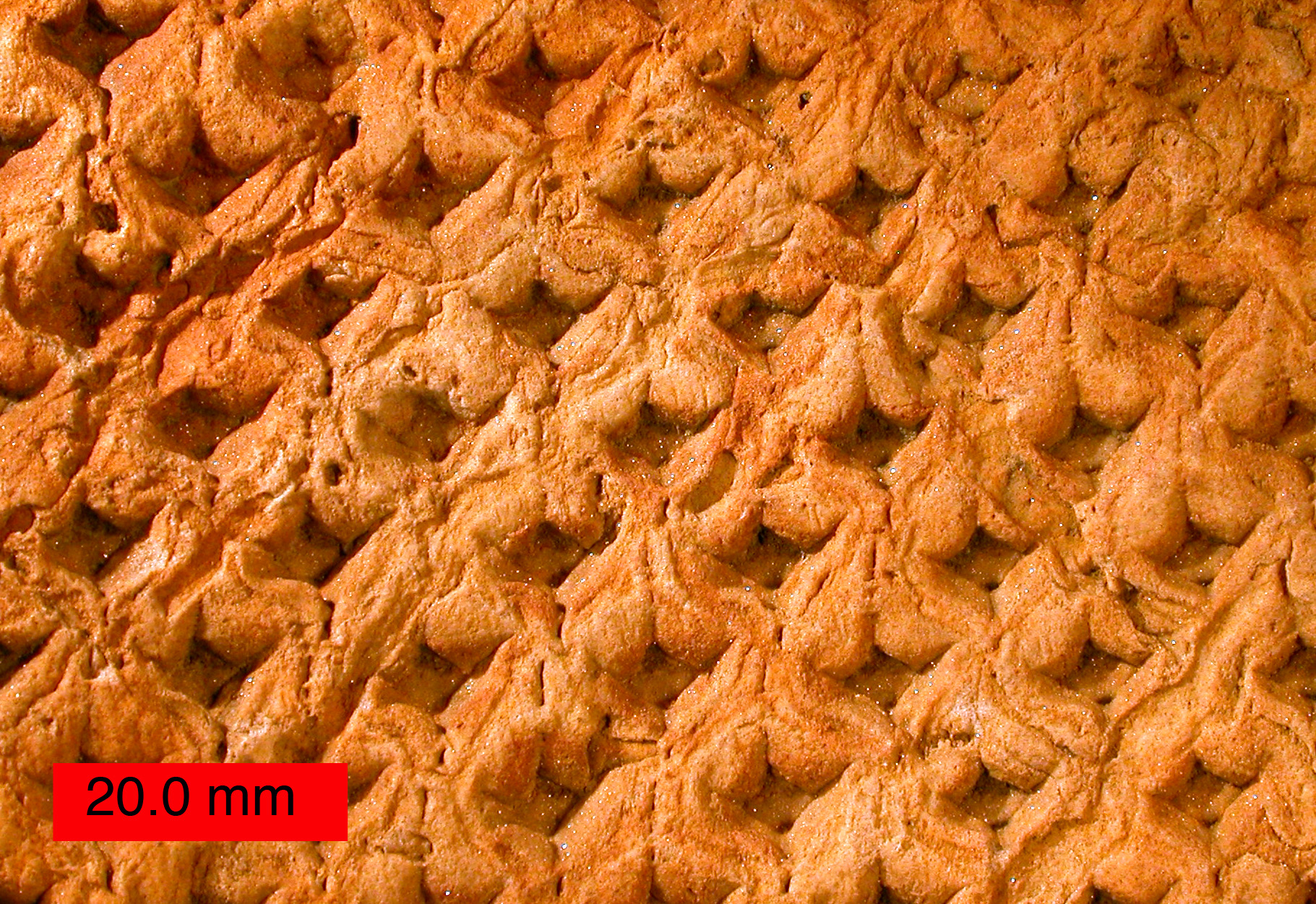
External mold of Lepidodendron from the Upper Carboniferous of Ohio.

Some plants have remained almost unchanged throughout earth's geological time scale. Horsetails had evolved by the Late Devonian, early ferns had evolved by the Mississippian, conifers by the Pennsylvanian. Some plants of prehistory are the same ones around today and are thus living fossils, such as Ginkgo biloba and Sciadopitys verticillata. Other plants have changed radically, or became extinct.

Examples of prehistoric plants are:

- Araucaria mirabilis
- Archaeopteris
- Calamites
- Dillhoffia
- Glossopteris
- Hymenaea protera
- Nelumbo aureavallis
- Pachypteris
- Palaeoraphe
- Peltandra primaeva
- Protosalvinia
- Trochodendron nastae

== Notable paleobotanists ==
- Edward W. Berry (1875–1945), paleoecology and phytogeography
- William Gilbert Chaloner (1928–2016)
- Isabel Cookson (1893–1973), early vascular plants, palynology
- Margaret Bryan Davis, (1931-), American paleoecologist and palynologist
- Dianne Edwards (1942–), colonization of land by early terrestrial floras
- Constantin von Ettingshausen (1826–1897), Tertiary floras
- Thomas Maxwell Harris (1903–1983), Mesozoic plants of Jameson Land (Greenland) and Yorkshire.
- Robert Kidston (1852–1924), early land plants, Devonian and Carboniferous floras, and their use in stratigraphy
- Ana María Ragonese (1928–1999), fossil wood morphology, spermatophytes
- Ethel Ida Sanborn (1883–1952), extinct flora of Oregon and the Western United States
- Birbal Sahni (1891–1949), Revision of Indian Gondwana Plants
- Dunkinfield Henry Scott (1854–1934), analysis of the structures of fossil plants
- Kaspar Maria von Sternberg (1761–1838), the "father of paleobotany"
- Franz Unger (1800–1870), pioneer in plant physiology, phytotomy and soil science
- Jack A. Wolfe (1936–2005), Tertiary paleoclimate of western North America
- Gilbert Arthur Leisman (1924–1996), known for work on Carboniferous lycophytes of central North America.

== See also ==
- Cryptospores
- Evolutionary history of plants
- Paleophycology
- Prehistoric life
- Timeline of plant evolution
