= National Botanical Garden of Seychelles =

Botanical preserve in Seychelles

- Victoria Botanical Gardens or Mont Fleuri Botanical Gardens or Jardin Botanique
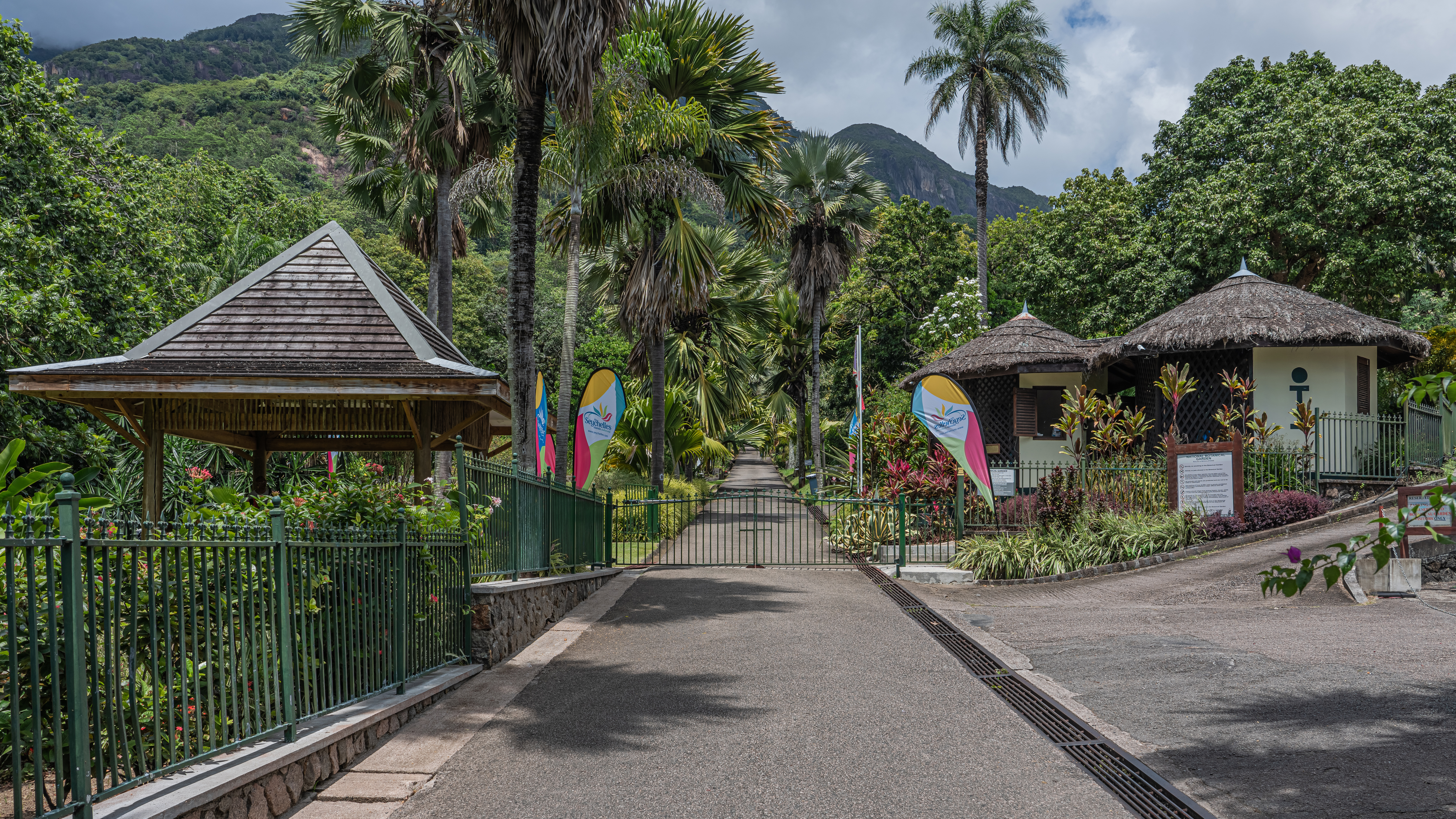
- Main entrance to Seychelles National Botanical Gardens in Victoria, Seychelles (2024)

- Location within Seychelles
- Type: Botanical garden
- Location: Mont Fleuri, Mahé, Seychelles
- Coordinates: 4.630737°S 55.4529919°E
- Area: 15 acres (6.1 ha)
- Opened: 1901
- Operator: Ministry of Agriculture, Climate Change & Environment
- Visitors: 26,000 per year
- Status: Open year round
- Website: Official website

The National Botanical Garden of Seychelles (also known as Victoria Botanical Garden and Mont Fleuri Botanical Garden) in Mahé, Seychelles.

== History ==
The garden was founded in 1901 by Mauritian agronomist Paul Evenor Rivalz Dupont, who served as the Director of Agricultural Services and Naturalist of Seychelles, with the aim of creating an agricultural station.

As of March 2024 the botanical garden accommodate both departments of Seychelles' Ministry of Agriculture, Climate Change & Environment: the Department of Climate Change & Energy, and the Department of Environment, which is also tasked with overseeing the management of the place.

== Research ==
The main objective of the garden is to function as a central hub for the preservation and study of biodiversity, featuring an arboretum and modern facilities for micropropagation and tissue culture. With an accession number of 500 and a cultivation taxa number of 150, the garden hosts special collections including a Biodiversity Centre and historically significant plants collected by its founder. Notably, it cultivates over 60% of the Seychelles' endemic flowering plants from the granitic islands, with an additional 20% undergoing trials in the propagation house. Active monitoring and management of invasive species are conducted to safeguard the native flora. The garden implements comprehensive conservation programmes, including efforts to conserve medicinal plants, ex situ conservation, and reintroduction programmes for endangered species, contributing significantly to the protection and restoration of Seychelles' unique biodiversity.

== Gallery ==
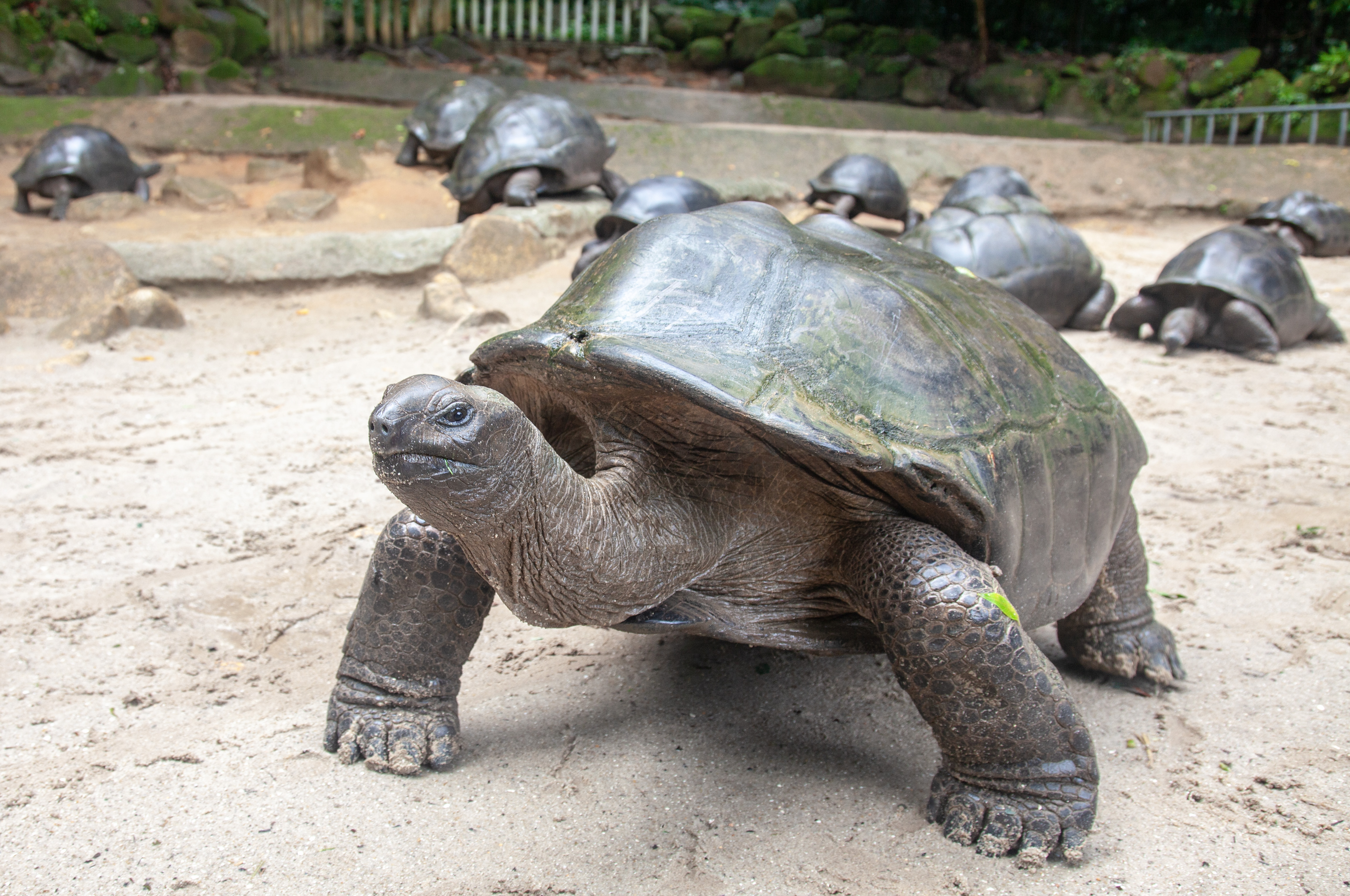
Aldabrachelys gigantea, at the Botanical Garden

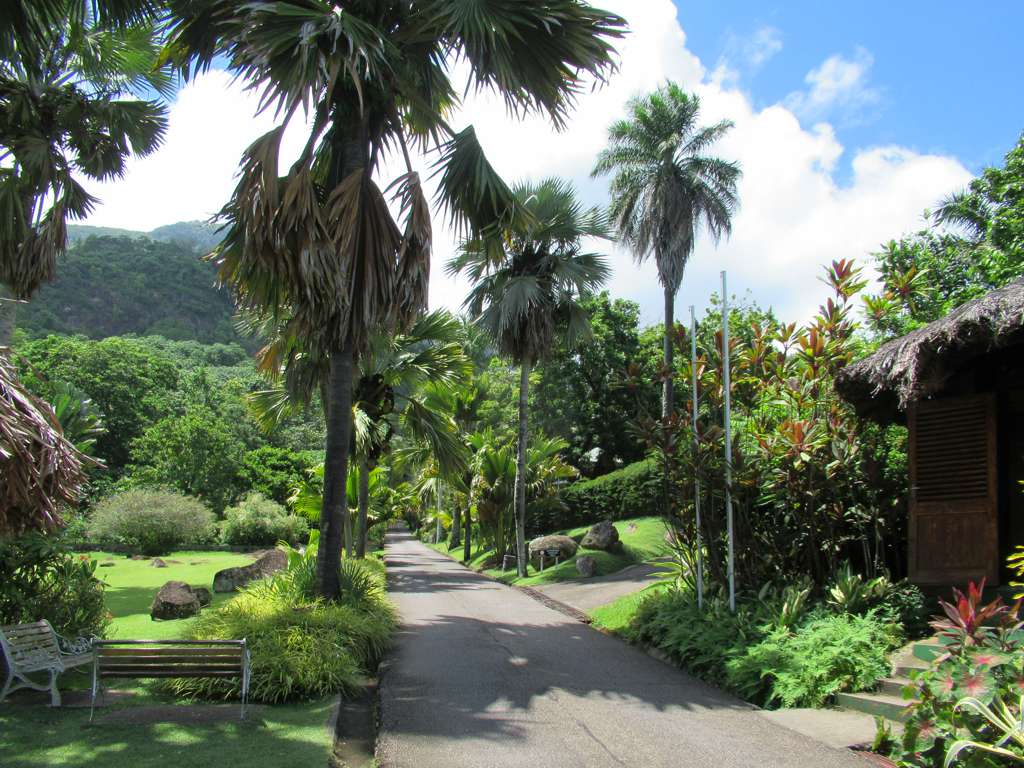
The main entry passage of the Botanical Garden

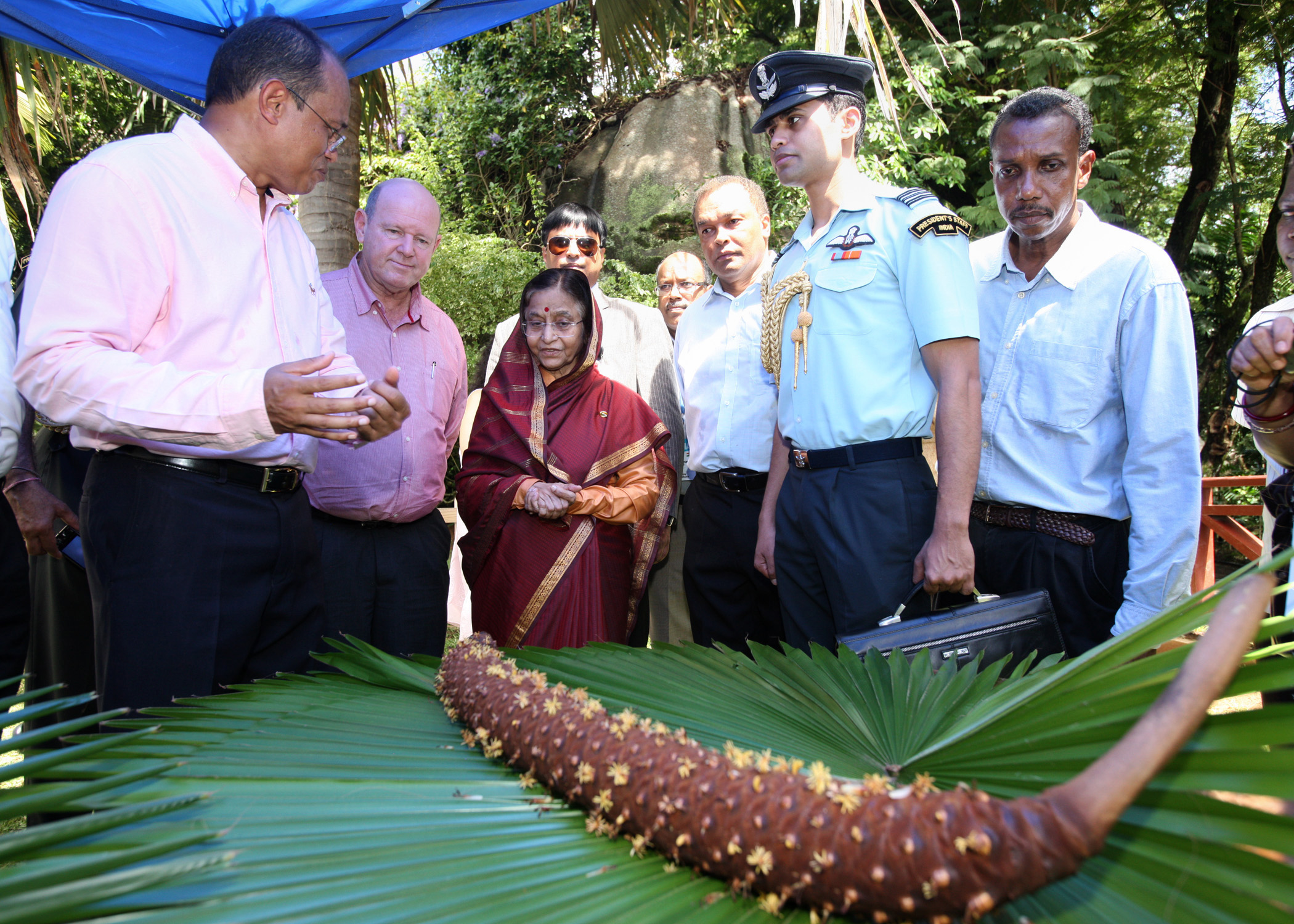
The Indian President, Pratibha Devisingh Patil visits the Botanical Garden, at Seychelles on May 01, 2012.

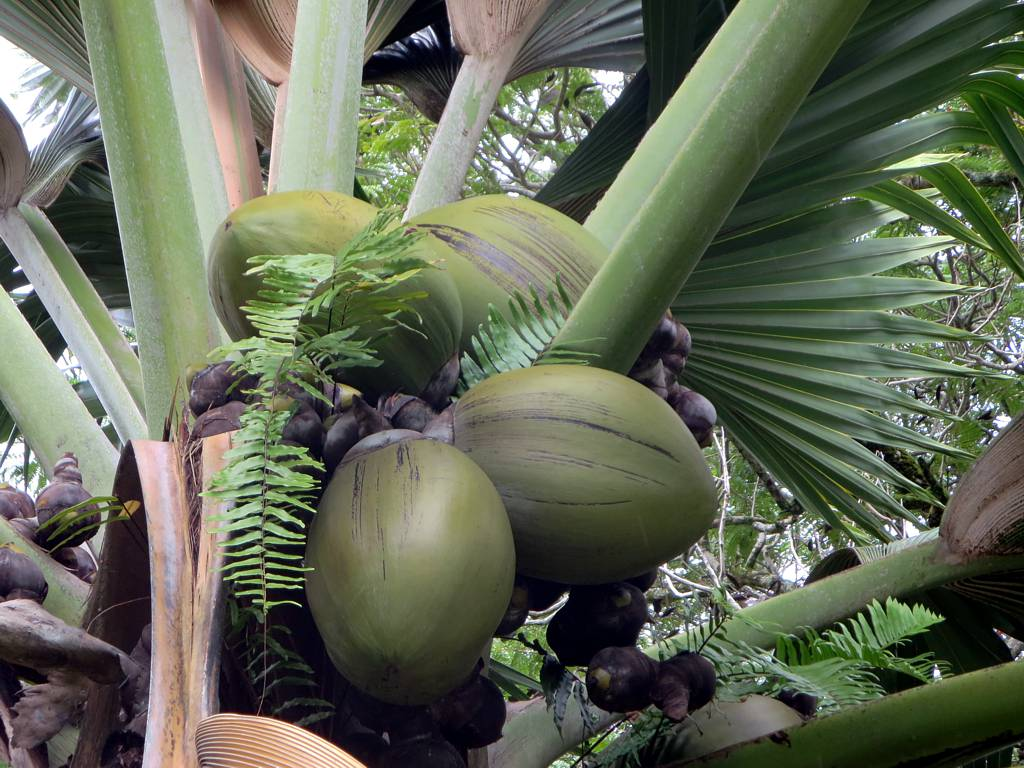
Several Lodoicea maldivica can be seen in the Botanical Garden

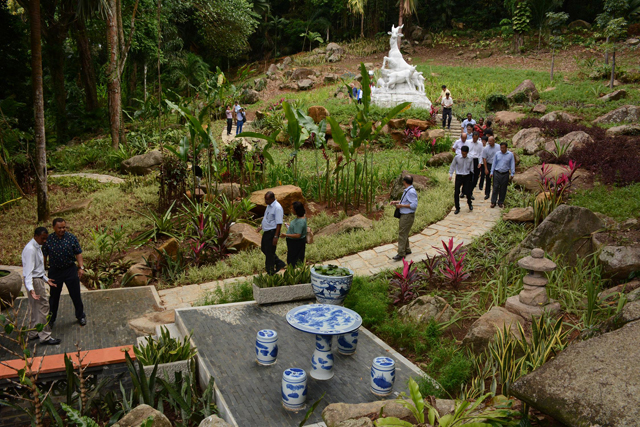
The Guangzhou Garden in the Botanical Garden of Victoria, Seychelles

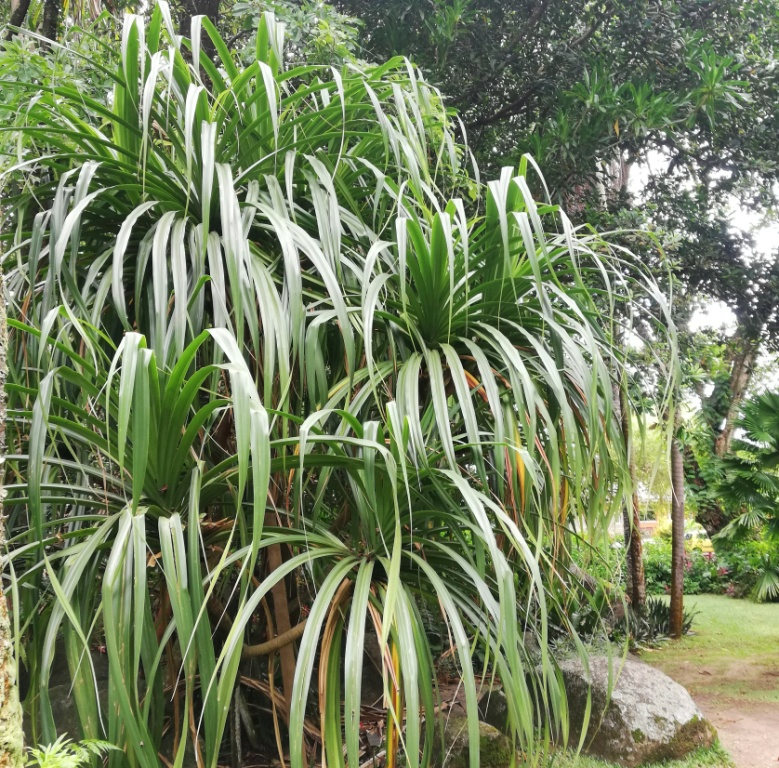
Pandanus sechellarum, growing in the Botanical Garden

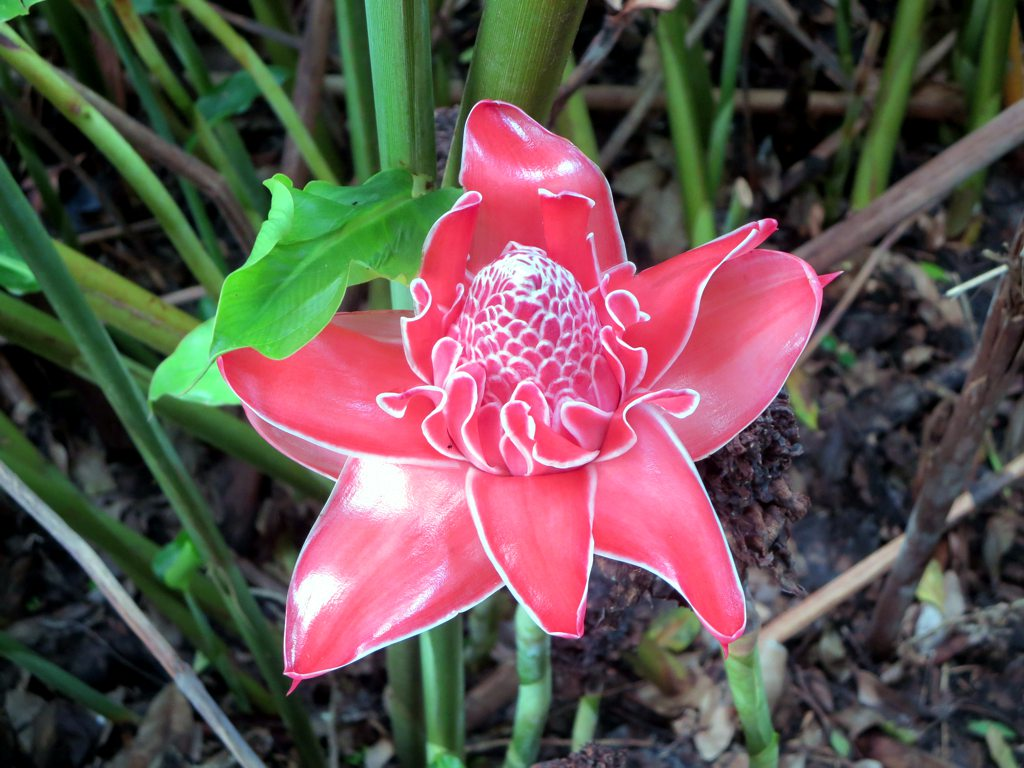
Etlingera elatior grows in the Botanical Garden

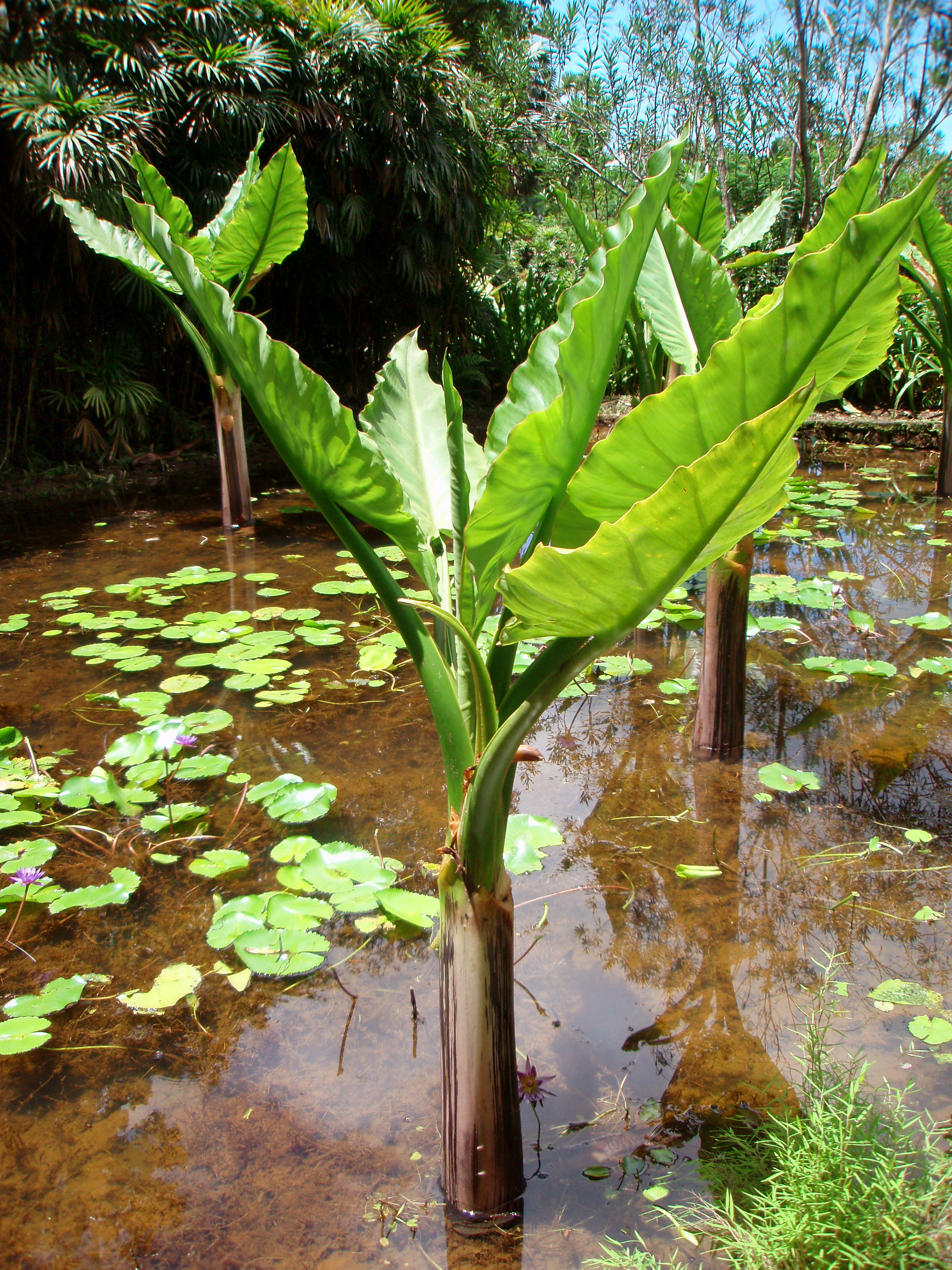
Typhonodorum lindleyanum in the Botanic Garden

Entry timings of the Botanical Gardens
