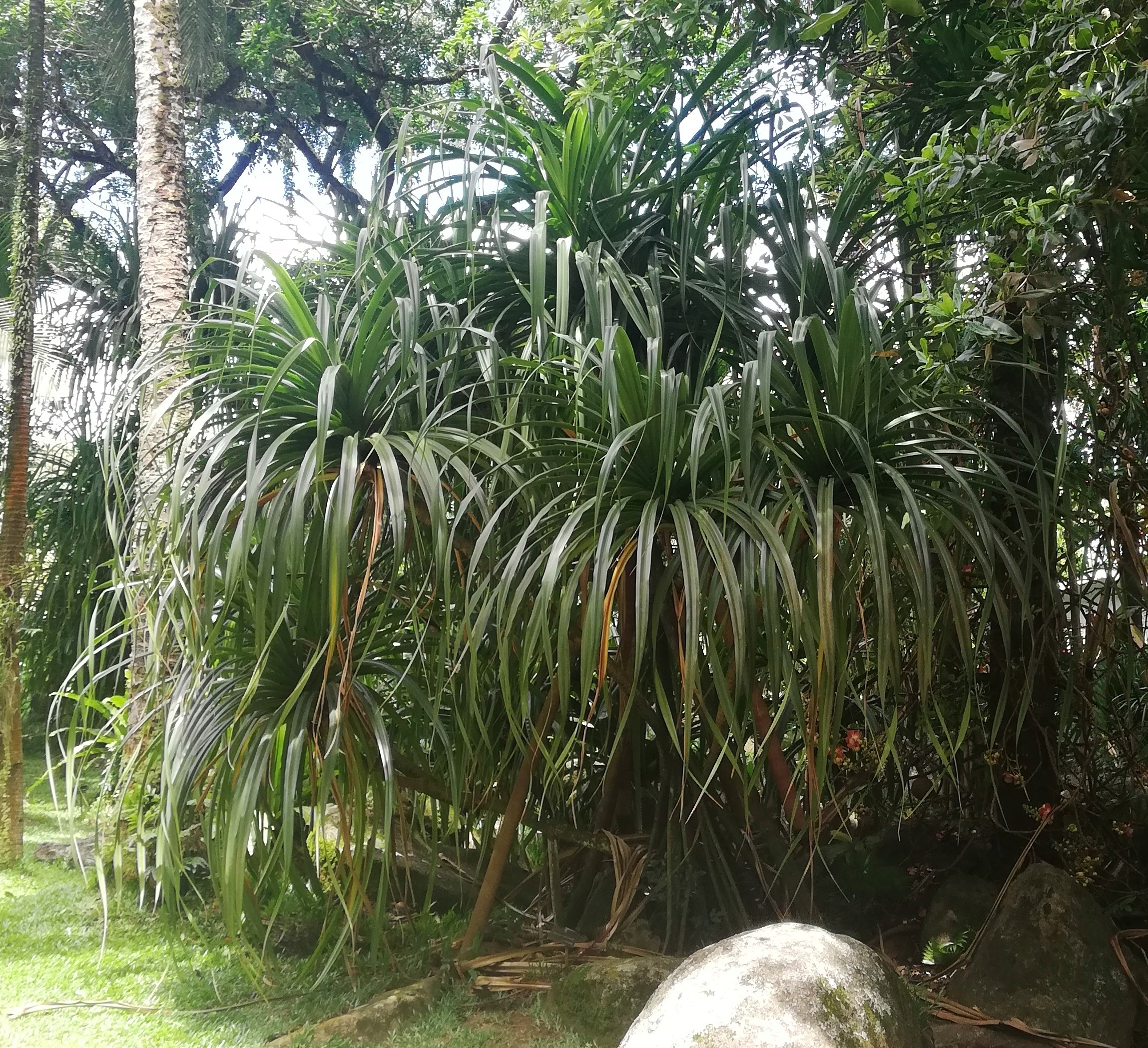
- Pandanus sechellarum growing in the Seychelles Botanical Gardens

Conservation status
- Near Threatened (IUCN 3.1)

Scientific classification
- Kingdom: Plantae
- Clade: Tracheophytes
- Clade: Angiosperms
- Clade: Monocots
- Order: Pandanales
- Family: Pandanaceae
- Genus: Pandanus
- Species: P. sechellarum

Binomial name
- Pandanus sechellarum Balf.f.

= Pandanus sechellarum =

Species of plant

Pandanus sechellarum ("Vakwa maron", also spelled "Vacoa marron") is a species of plant in the family Pandanaceae. It is one of four species in the family that are endemic to the Seychelles.

== Description ==
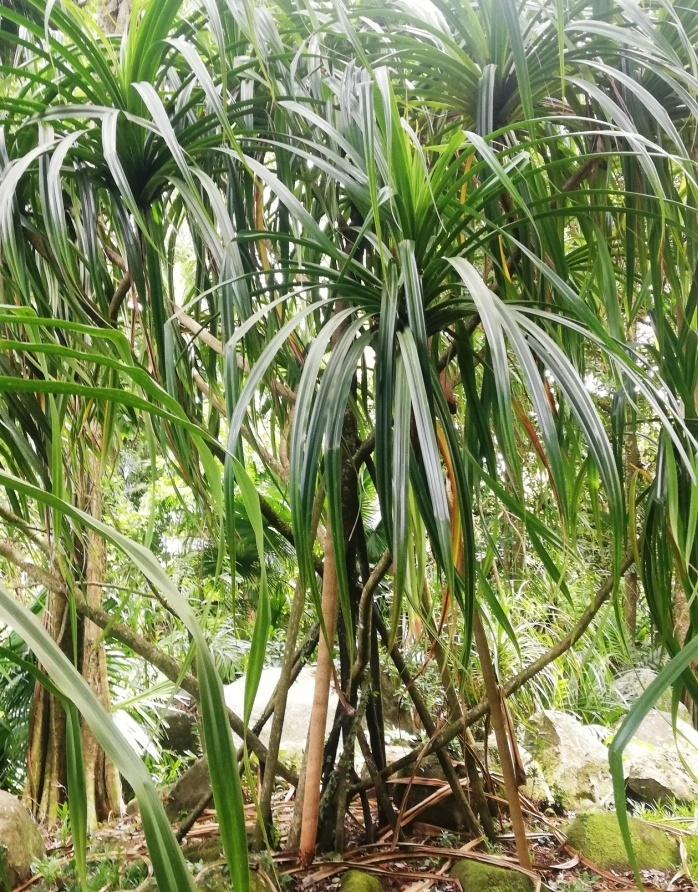
The prominent stilt-roots of Pandanus sechellarum

This species of Pandanus, growing up to 15 m (49 ft) height, has extremely large and prominent stilt roots, that grow individually and far apart, from high up on the trunk. They can be up to 10 m (33 ft) long, and sometimes over 12 m (39 ft). exceeded in length only by some banyan (Ficus spp.) roots. Its medium-sized (30 cm), spherical fruit contains about 70 individual fruit segments called pyrenes, and hangs from the stem on a stalk.

== Distribution and habitat ==
Pandanus sechellarum was formerly one of the most common species in the indigenous vegetation of the Seychelles. Currently it is usually found on steep terrain, river valleys or in accessible mountain tops.

Other indigenous Pandanaceae of the Seychelles include Martellidendron hornei, Pandanus balfourii, and Pandanus multispicatus. The Madagascan species Pandanus utilis is introduced and is now also widespread.
