= William Strachey =

English writer (1572–1621)

William Strachey Esquire
- Born: 4 April 1572; Saffron Walden, Essex, England
- Died: August 1621 (aged 49)
- Burial place: St Giles' Church, Camberwell
- Occupations: Adventurer, chronicler, secretary
- Notable work: True Reportory (1610), The Historie of Travaile Into Virginia Britannia (1619)
- Spouse(s): Frances Forster; Dorothy (surname unknown)
- Children: 2
- Parent(s): William Strachey; Mary Cooke
- Family: John Strachey (geologist) (great-grandson)

William Strachey (4 April 1572 – buried 16 August 1621) was an English writer whose works are among the primary sources for the early history of the English colonisation of North America. He is best remembered today as the eye-witness reporter of the 1609 shipwreck on the uninhabited island of Bermuda of the colonial ship Sea Venture, which was caught in a hurricane while sailing to Virginia. The survivors eventually reached Virginia after building two small ships during the ten months they spent on the island. His account of the incident and of the Virginia colony is thought by most Shakespearean scholars to have been a source for Shakespeare's play The Tempest.

== Family ==
Coat of Arms of William Strachey

William Strachey, born 4 April 1572 in Saffron Walden, Essex, was the grandson of William Strachey (died 1587), and the eldest son of William Strachey (died 1598) and Mary Cooke (died 1587), the daughter of Henry Cooke, Merchant Taylor of London, by Anne Goodere, the daughter of Henry Goodere and Jane Greene. Strachey's maternal grandfather, Henry Cooke (died 1551), held Lesnes Abbey in Kent; he was succeeded by his son, Edmund Cooke (died 1619), while his younger son, Richard Cooke, has been identified as the author of Description de Tous les Provinces de France.

By his father's first marriage Strachey had three brothers and three sisters. Strachey's mother died in 1587, and in August of that year Strachey's father married Elizabeth Brocket of Hertfordshire, by whom he had five daughters.

Strachey was brought up on an estate purchased by his grandfather in the 1560s. In 1588, at the age of sixteen, he entered Emmanuel College, Cambridge, but did not take a degree. In 1605 he was at Gray's Inn, but there is no evidence that he made the law his profession. In 1602 he inherited his father's estate following a legal dispute with Elizabeth Brocket, his stepmother.

== Career ==
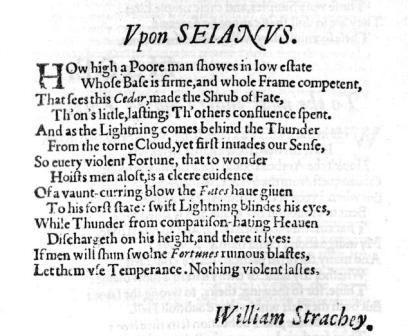
Strachey's sonnet, Upon Sejanus, published in Ben Jonson's Sejanus His Fall (1605)

Strachey wrote a sonnet, Upon Sejanus, which was published in the 1605 edition of the 1603 play Sejanus His Fall by Ben Jonson.

Strachey also kept a residence in London, where he regularly attended plays. He was a shareholder in the Children of the Revels, a troupe of boy actors who performed 'in a converted room in the former Blackfriars monastery', as evidenced by his deposition in a lawsuit in 1606. According to Sisson:

In 1600 Richard Burbage leased to [Henry] Evans his Blackfriars property, and the Children of the Revels under Nathaniel Giles, with Evans as landlord and partner, occupied the theatre for some years. Evans assigned his rights in the property and the company in two stages, first one-half in sixths to [Edward] Kirkham, [Thomas] Kendall and [William] Rastell, and subsequently the second half in sixths to John Marston, William Strachey, and his own wife. There were later complications. But in 1606 William Strachey had a one-sixth share in the Blackfriars Theatre. Strachey, there is no manner of doubt on the evidence and from the signature of his deposition, was the well-known voyager and writer whose account of the Bermuda voyage left its marks on Shakespeare’s Tempest. He gave evidence in the suit as ‘William Strachey, of Crowhurst, Surrey, gentleman, aged 34’ on 4 July 1606.

Strachey became friends with the city's poets and playwrights, including Thomas Campion, John Donne, Ben Jonson, Hugh Holland, John Marston, George Chapman, and Matthew Roydon, many of them members of the "Fraternity of Sireniacal Gentlemen" who met at the Mermaid Tavern.

By 1605 Strachey was in precarious financial circumstances from which he spent the rest of his life trying to recover. In 1606 he used a family connection to obtain the position of secretary to Thomas Glover, the English ambassador to Turkey. He travelled to Constantinople, but quarrelled with the ambassador and was dismissed in March 1607 and returned to England in June 1608. He then decided to mend his fortunes in the New World, and in 1609 purchased two shares in the Virginia Company and sailed to Virginia on the Sea Venture with Sir Thomas Gates and Sir George Somers in the summer of that year.

=== Shipwreck of the Sea Venture ===
Strachey was a passenger aboard the flagship Sea Venture with the leaders of the expedition when the ship was blown off course by a hurricane. Leaking, and with its foundering imminent, the ship was run aground off the coast of Bermuda, accidentally beginning England's colonisation of that Atlantic archipelago. The group was stranded on the island for almost a year, during which they constructed two small boats in which they eventually completed the voyage to Virginia.

Strachey wrote an eloquent letter dated 15 July 1610, to an unnamed "Excellent Lady" in England about the Sea Venture disaster, including an account of the precarious state of the Jamestown colony. Being critical of the management of the colony, it was suppressed by the Virginia Company. After the dissolution of the company it was published in 1625 by Samuel Purchas as "A true reportory of the wracke, and redemption of Sir THOMAS GATES Knight". It is generally thought to be one of the sources for Shakespeare's The Tempest because of certain verbal, plot and thematic similarities.

Strachey's writings are among the few first-hand descriptions of Virginia in the period. His glossary of words of the Powhatan is one of only two records of the language (the other being Captain John Smith's).

=== Later life and death ===
Strachey remained at Jamestown for less than a year, but during that time he became the Secretary of the Colony after the drowning death of Matthew Scrivener in 1609. He returned to England probably in late 1611 and published a compilation of the colonial laws put in place by the governors.

He then produced an extended manuscript about the Virginia colony, The Historie of Travaile Into Virginia Britannia, dedicating the first version to Henry Percy, 9th Earl of Northumberland, in 1612. The manuscript included his eyewitness account of life in early Virginia, but borrowed heavily from the earlier work of Richard Willes, James Rosier, John Smith, and others. Strachey produced two more versions during the next six years, dedicating one to Francis Bacon and the other to Sir Allen Apsley. It too was critical of the Virginia Company management of the colony, and Strachey failed to find a patron to publish his work, which was finally first published in 1849 by the Hakluyt Society.

Strachey died of unknown causes in August 1621. The parish register of St Giles' Church, Camberwell, in Southwark records his burial on 16 August 1621. He died in poverty, leaving this verse:

Hark! Twas the trump of death that blew
My hour has come. False world adieu
Thy pleasures have betrayed me so
That I to death untimely go.

In 1996, Strachey's signet ring was discovered in the ruins of Jamestown, identified by the family seal, an eagle.

== Marriages and issue ==
On 9 June 1595 Strachey married Frances Forster, 'the daughter of a prosperous Surrey family with political connections'. Frances Forster was the daughter of William Forster and Elizabeth Draper (died 22 April 1605), widow of John Bowyer (died 10 October 1570) of Shepton Beauchamp, Somerset, and daughter of Robert Draper of Camberwell, Surrey, Page of the Jewels to King Henry VIII, by Elizabeth Fyfield. Strachey lived in London while Frances remained at her father's estate in Crowhurst, Surrey. They had two children, William Strachey (died 1635), born in March 1596/97, and Edmund Strachey, born in 1604. Frances died before 1615, and at some time before that date Strachey married a widow whose first name was Dorothy, by whom he does not appear to have had any issue.

Strachey's son, William, married three times, and died in 1635.

== Works ==
- A true reportory of the wracke, and redemption of Sir THOMAS GATES Knight
- For The Colony in Virginea Britannia. Lawes Divine, Morall and Martiall, &c. original-spelling version and modern-spelling version at Virtual Jamestown.
- The Historie of Travaile Into Virginia Britannia
- "A Dictionary of Powhatan" at Google Books.
