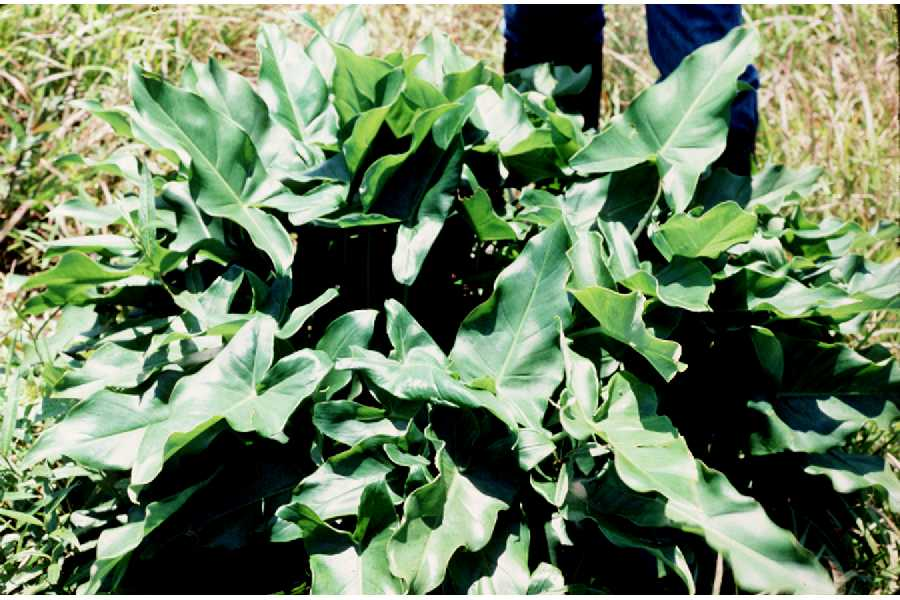
- Peltandra virginica

Scientific classification
- Kingdom: Plantae
- Clade: Tracheophytes
- Clade: Angiosperms
- Clade: Monocots
- Order: Alismatales
- Family: Araceae
- Subfamily: Aroideae
- Tribe: Peltandreae
- Genus: Peltandra; Raf.
- Range of the genus Peltandra.

Synonyms
- Lecontia W.Cooper ex Torr.; Rensselaeria L.C.Beck

= Peltandra =

Arrow arums

Genus of flowering plants

Peltandra, the arrow arums, is a genus of plants in the family Araceae. It is native to the eastern United States, eastern Canada, and Cuba.

Species

- Peltandra sagittifolia - (Michx.) Morong - Spoon flower or the white arrow arum - southeastern US from eastern Louisiana to Virginia
- Peltandra virginica (L.) Schott - Arum arrow - Cuba, Quebec, Ontario, Oregon, California, Washington; eastern US from Maine to Florida, west to Texas, Kansas, and Minnesota
- †Peltandra primaeva – Eocene, Golden Valley Formation, North Dakota, USA
