= The Historie of Travaile Into Virginia Britannia =

1612 historical book by William Strachey

The Historie of Travaile Into Virginia Britannia, published by Hakluyt Society

The Historie of Travaile Into Virginia Britannia (Note: Full title, Historie of Travaile into Virginia Britannia; Expressing the Cosmographie and Comodities of the Country, Together with the Manners and Customes of the People) is a 1619 historical book by William Strachey, one of the most prominent primary sources on the earliest English colonization efforts in North America. He was a settler at Jamestown, and wrote extensively of the Powhatan civilization. Because of its critiques of the London Company, it did not receive publication in its own time; delayed until 1849 when the Hakluyt Society finally pressed and released the text. It was also feared to have a negative contrast with John Smith's own book, published in the same year.

== See also ==
- True Reportory
