= Peltandra sagittifolia =

Scientific classification
- Kingdom: Plantae
- Clade: Tracheophytes
- Clade: Angiosperms
- Clade: Monocots
- Order: Alismatales
- Family: Araceae
- Genus: Peltandra
- Species: P. sagittifolia

Binomial name
- Peltandra sagittifolia (Michaux) Morong

Synonyms
- Calla sagittifolia Michx.; Caladium glaucum Elliott; Peltandra alba Raf.; Peltandra glauca (Elliott) Feay ex Alph.Wood

Species of flowering plant

Peltandra sagittifolia is a species of plant in the genus Peltandra. It is commonly known as the spoonflower or the white arrow arum, native to the southeastern United States from eastern Louisiana to eastern Virginia.
