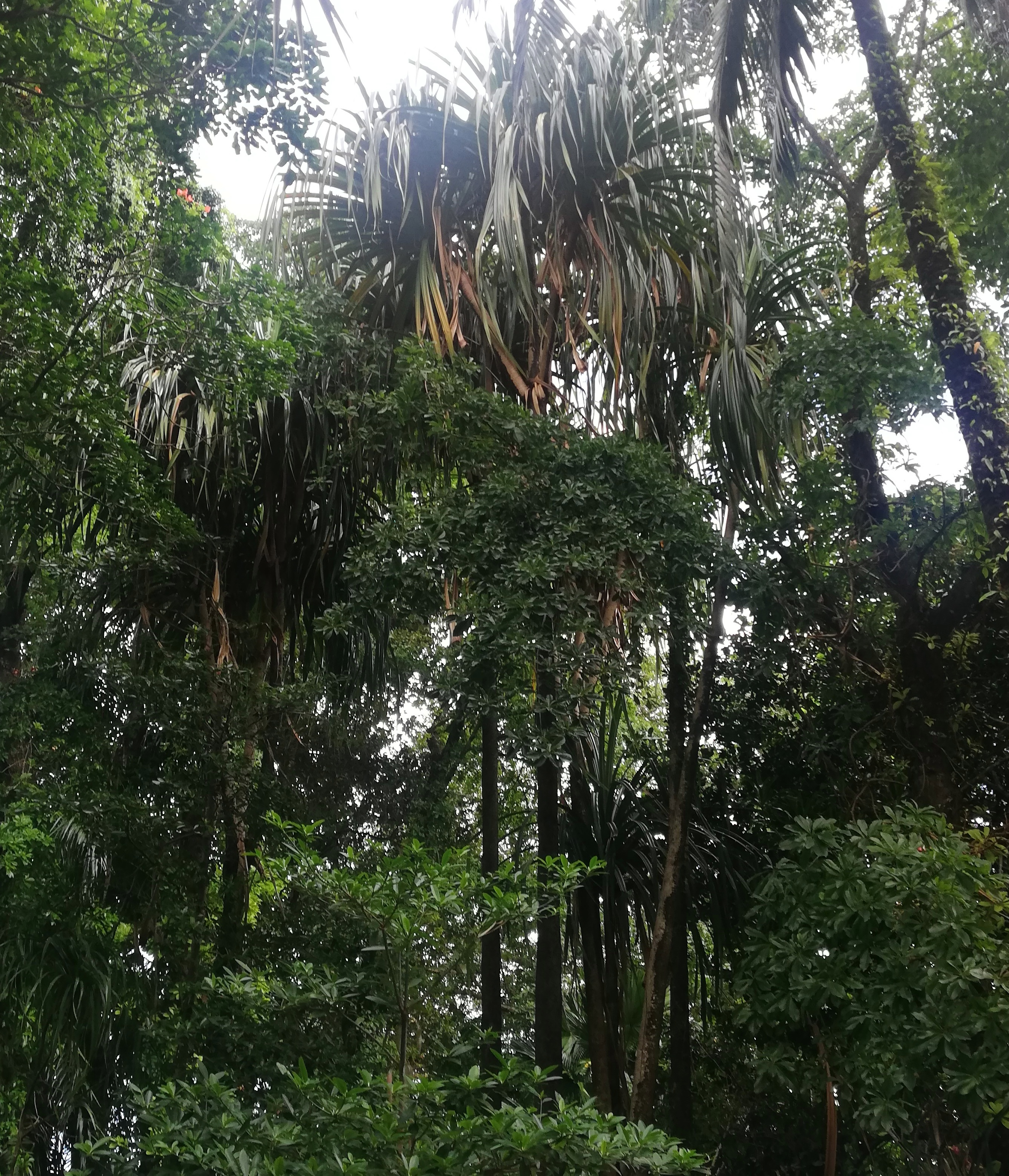

Conservation status
- Vulnerable (IUCN 2.3)

Scientific classification
- Kingdom: Plantae
- Clade: Tracheophytes
- Clade: Angiosperms
- Clade: Monocots
- Order: Pandanales
- Family: Pandanaceae
- Genus: Martellidendron
- Species: M. hornei

Binomial name
- Martellidendron hornei Balf.f. Callm. & Chassot (2003)

Synonyms
- Pandanus hornei Balf.f. (1877)

= Martellidendron hornei =

Species of tree

Martellidendron hornei (Vakwa parasol, or Vacoa parasol) is a species of plant in the family Pandanaceae, one of several species in this family that are endemic to the Seychelles.

== Description ==
This species is an erect tree to 15 m (49 ft) tall. It has a single straight trunk, with a spreading, parasol-like canopy only near the top. Its branches usually divide into groups of three. This is not trichotomous, but probably the result of having three ranks of leaves. The multiple fruit is up to 30 cm (12 in) in diameter with large pyrenes, each up to 14 cm (5.5 in) long and containing one seed. They are mostly yellow with a green outer tip.

It has stilt roots that are characteristically large but very closely packed.

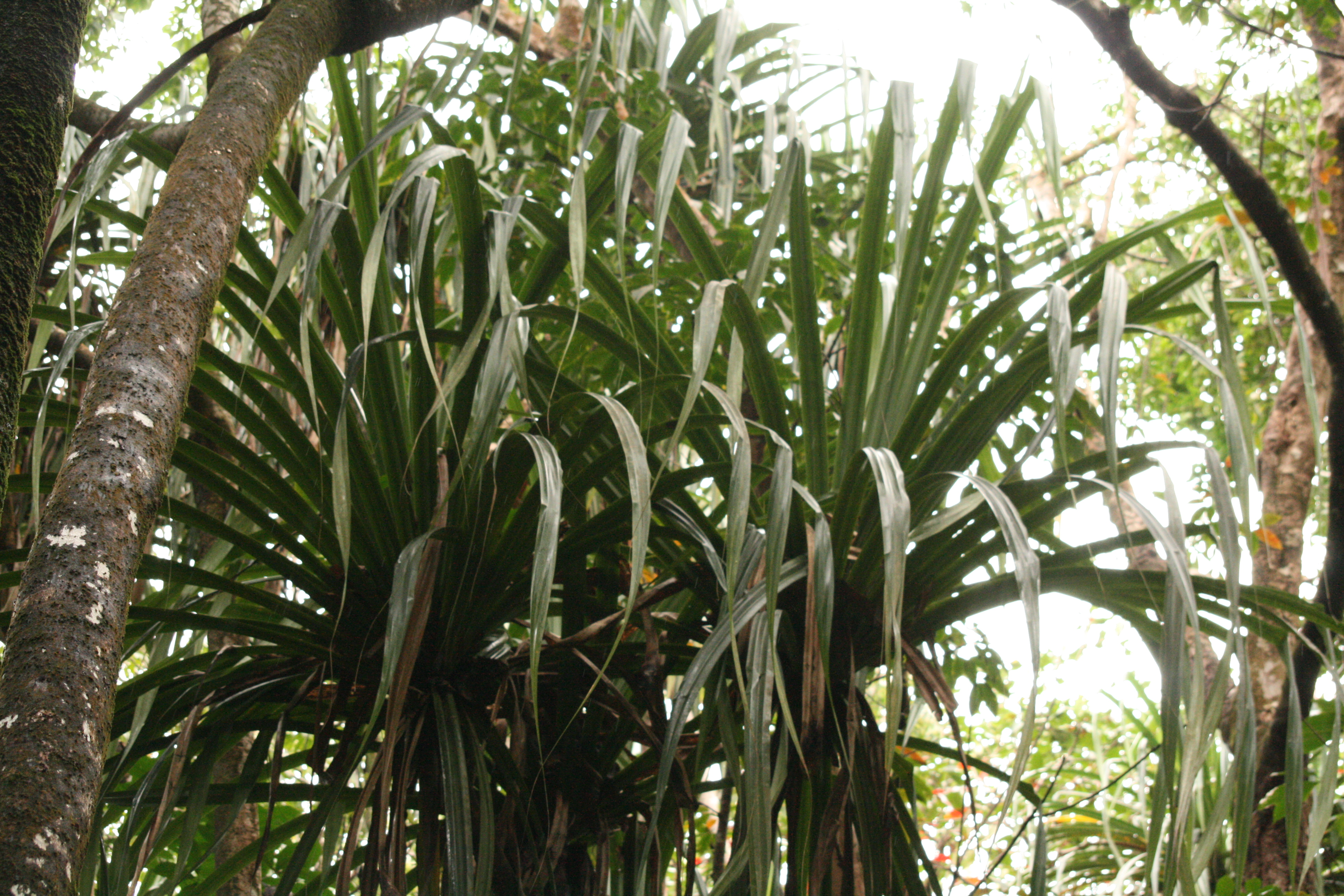
Rosette detail

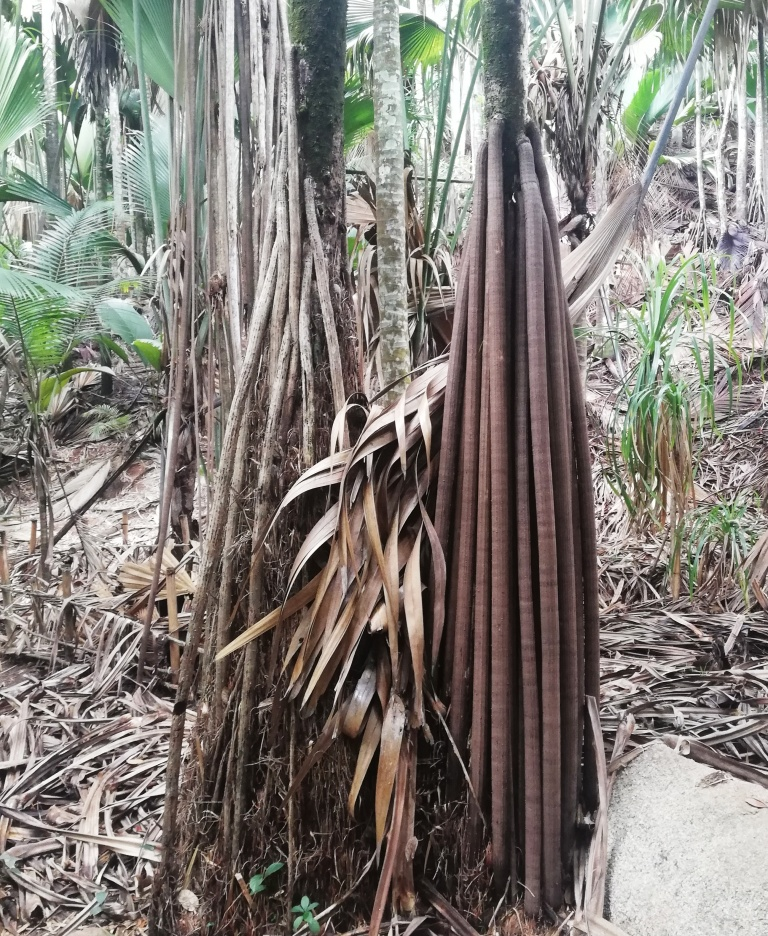
The close-packed stilt roots of two specimens

== Distribution and habitat ==
Martellidendron hornei is endemic to the Seychelles, and was formerly common on all of the granitic islands. In valleys and on wetter slopes it was a dominant part of the original forests. It is currently threatened by habitat loss and invasive alien species such as Falcataria falcata.
