= List of Pandanus species =

The following list includes all 565 species in this genus that are accepted by Plants of the World Online as of 18 May 2026

== A ==
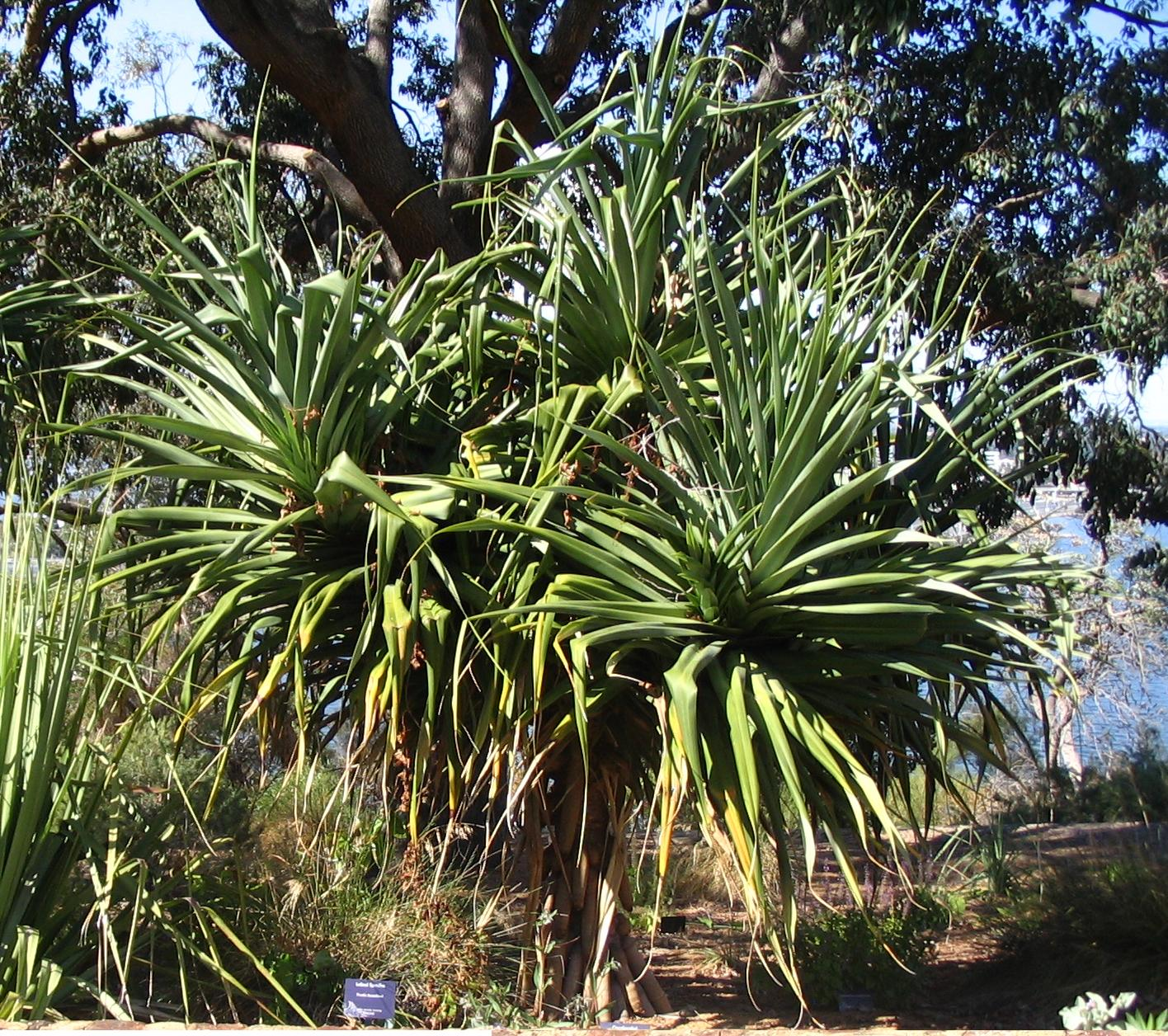
Pandanus aquaticus

- Pandanus abbiwii Huynh
- Pandanus acanthostylus Martelli
- Pandanus acaulescens H.St.John
- Pandanus acladus Merr.
- Pandanus adpressus H.St.John
- Pandanus aecuatus H.St.John
- Pandanus aggregatus Merr. & L.M.Perry
- Pandanus akeassii Huynh
- Pandanus alatus H.St.John
- Pandanus albifrons B.C.Stone
- Pandanus aldabraensis H.St.John
- Pandanus alifer H.St.John
- Pandanus alkemadei Martelli
- Pandanus alpestris Martelli
- Pandanus alticonvexus H.St.John
- Pandanus altissimus (Brongn.) Solms
- Pandanus alveatus H.St.John
- Pandanus alveolatus Huynh
- Pandanus amaryllifolius Roxb.
- Pandanus ambalavaoensis Huynh
- Pandanus ambohitantelensis Huynh
- Pandanus ambongensis Martelli
- Pandanus amicalis H.St.John
- Pandanus amissus Huynh
- Pandanus amnicola H.St.John
- Pandanus analamazaotrensis Martelli
- Pandanus analamerensis Huynh
- Pandanus ananas Martelli
- Pandanus andringitrensis Huynh
- Pandanus angolensis Huynh
- Pandanus ankaranensis Callm. & Laivao
- Pandanus anomesos H.St.John
- Pandanus antaresensis H.St.John
- Pandanus apiculatus Merr.
- Pandanus apoensis Martelli
- Pandanus aprilensis H.St.John
- Pandanus aquaticus F.Muell.
- Pandanus aragoensis (Brongn.) Solms
- Pandanus arapepe H.St.John
- Pandanus archboldianus Merr. & L.M.Perry
- Pandanus arenicola Huynh
- Pandanus aridus H.St.John
- Pandanus aristatus Martelli
- Pandanus arrectialatus H.St.John
- Pandanus associatus Huynh
- Pandanus atropurpureus Merr. & L.M.Perry
- Pandanus augustianus L.Linden & Rodigas
- Pandanus austrosinensis T.L.Wu

== B ==
- Pandanus bakeri Warb.
- Pandanus balansae (Brongn.) Solms
- Pandanus balenii Martelli
- Pandanus balfourii Martelli
- Pandanus bantamensis Koord.
- Pandanus barai Martelli
- Pandanus barbellatus Huynh
- Pandanus barkleyi Balf.f.
- Pandanus basalticola H.St.John
- Pandanus basedowii C.H.Wright
- Pandanus basilocularis Martelli
- Pandanus bathiei Martelli
- Pandanus beccarii Solms
- Pandanus beguinii Callm. & A.P.Keim
- Pandanus belepensis Callm. & Munzinger
- Pandanus bemarahensis Huynh
- Pandanus benstoneoides Callm., Buerki & Phillipson
- Pandanus bernardii H.St.John ex Callm.
- Pandanus biceps B.C.Stone & Guillaumet
- Pandanus bilinearis H.St.John
- Pandanus biliranensis Merr.
- Pandanus bilobatus H.St.John ex Huynh
- Pandanus bipollicaris H.St.John
- Pandanus bipyramidatus Martelli
- Pandanus bismarckensis H.St.John
- Pandanus boemiensis Kaneh.
- Pandanus boivinii Solms
- Pandanus boninensis Warb.
- Pandanus borneensis Warb.
- Pandanus botryoides Martelli
- Pandanus bowersiae H.St.John
- Pandanus brachus H.St.John
- Pandanus brachycarpus Martelli
- Pandanus brachyphyllus Merr. & L.M.Perry
- Pandanus brachyspathus Martelli
- Pandanus bracteosus H.St.John
- Pandanus brassii Martelli
- Pandanus breviendocarpicus H.St.John
- Pandanus brevifrugalis Huynh
- Pandanus brevistipes Martelli
- Pandanus brongniartii H.St.John
- Pandanus brookei Martelli
- Pandanus brosimos Merr. & L.M.Perry
- Pandanus bryanii H.St.John
- Pandanus buinensis Merr. & L.M.Perry
- Pandanus burkillianus Ridl.
- Pandanus burmanicus B.C.Stone
- Pandanus busuangaensis Merr.
- Pandanus butayei De Wild.

== C ==
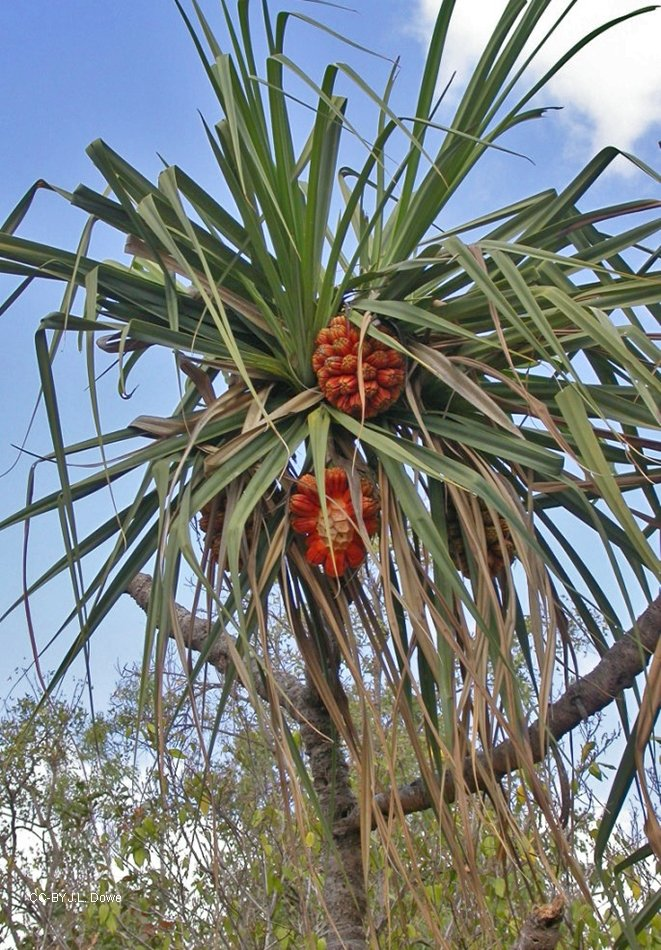
Pandanus cookii

- Pandanus calamianensis Merr.
- Pandanus calathiphorus (Gaudich. ex Decne.) Balf.f.
- Pandanus calceiformis Martelli
- Pandanus calcis H.St.John
- Pandanus callmanderiana Laivao & Buerki
- Pandanus calostigma Martelli
- Pandanus calvus B.C.Stone
- Pandanus camarinensis Merr.
- Pandanus candelabrum P.Beauv.
- Pandanus capitellatus Merr. & L.M.Perry
- Pandanus capusii Martelli
- Pandanus caricosus Spreng.
- Pandanus carmichaelii R.E.Vaughan & Wiehe
- Pandanus carrii H.St.John
- Pandanus castaneus H.St.John & B.C.Stone
- Pandanus caudatus Merr.
- Pandanus cavatus H.St.John
- Pandanus cephalotus B.C.Stone
- Pandanus ceratostigma Martelli
- Pandanus ceylanicus Solms
- Pandanus cheilostigma B.C.Stone
- Pandanus chiliocarpus Stapf
- Pandanus christmatensis Martelli
- Pandanus cissei Huynh
- Pandanus clandestinus B.C.Stone
- Pandanus clarkei B.C.Stone
- Pandanus clausus H.St.John
- Pandanus clementis Merr.
- Pandanus columellatus Huynh
- Pandanus columnaris H.St.John
- Pandanus comatus Martelli
- Pandanus concavus H.St.John
- Pandanus concinnus Merr. & L.M.Perry
- Pandanus concretus Baker
- Pandanus conglomeratus Balf.f.
- Pandanus conicus H.St.John
- Pandanus connatus H.St.John
- Pandanus conoideus Lam.
- Pandanus cookii Martelli
- Pandanus coriaceus Huynh
- Pandanus cornifer H.St.John
- Pandanus crassicollis Huynh
- Pandanus crassilix Huynh
- Pandanus crenifer H.St.John
- Pandanus crinifolius Martelli
- Pandanus cubicus H.St.John
- Pandanus cumingianus Martelli
- Pandanus cuneatus Huynh
- Pandanus cuneiformis H.St.John
- Pandanus cupribasalis H.St.John

== D-E ==
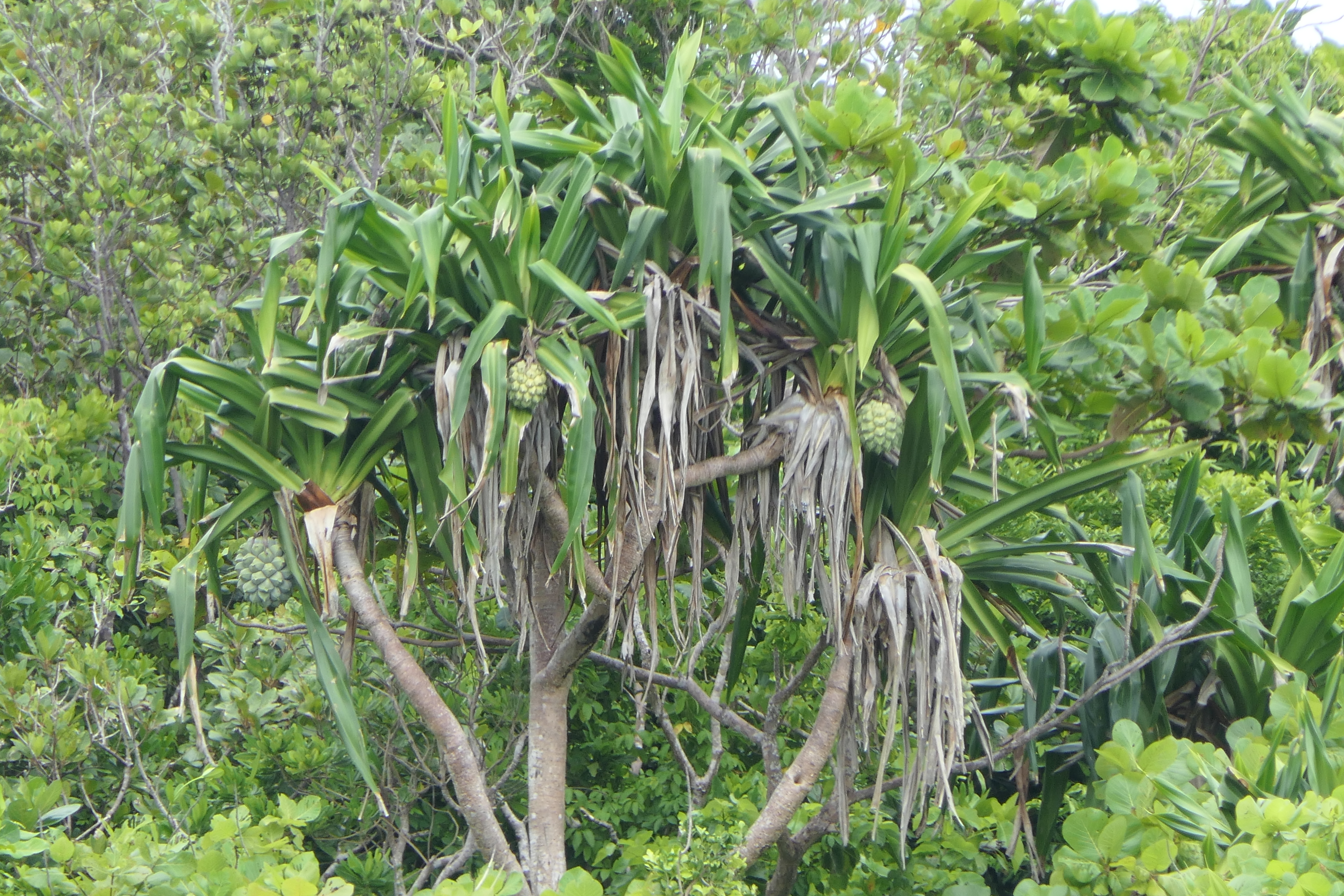
Pandanus dubius

- Pandanus daenikeri H.St.John
- Pandanus daitoensis Susanti & J.Miyam.
- Pandanus darwinensis H.St.John
- Pandanus dasodes H.St.John
- Pandanus daymanensis H.St.John
- Pandanus decastigma B.C.Stone
- Pandanus decipiens Martelli
- Pandanus decumbens (Brongn.) Solms
- Pandanus decus-montium B.C.Stone
- Pandanus denudatus Huynh
- Pandanus depauperatus Merr.
- Pandanus dictyotus H.St.John ex B.C.Stone
- Pandanus diffusus Martelli
- Pandanus dinagatensis Merr.
- Pandanus discostigma Martelli
- Pandanus diversus H.St.John
- Pandanus dolichopodus Merr. & L.M.Perry
- Pandanus dorystigma Martelli
- Pandanus drupaceus Thouars
- Pandanus dubius Spreng.
- Pandanus dyckioides Baker
- Pandanus dyeri Sander
- Pandanus echinops Huynh
- Pandanus edulis Thouars
- Pandanus efateensis H.St.John
- Pandanus elatus Ridl.
- Pandanus emarginatus H.St.John
- Pandanus ensifolius Thouars
- Pandanus esculentus Martelli
- Pandanus exaltatus Blanco
- Pandanus exiguus Merr. & L.M.Perry
- Pandanus eydouxia Balf.f.

== F ==
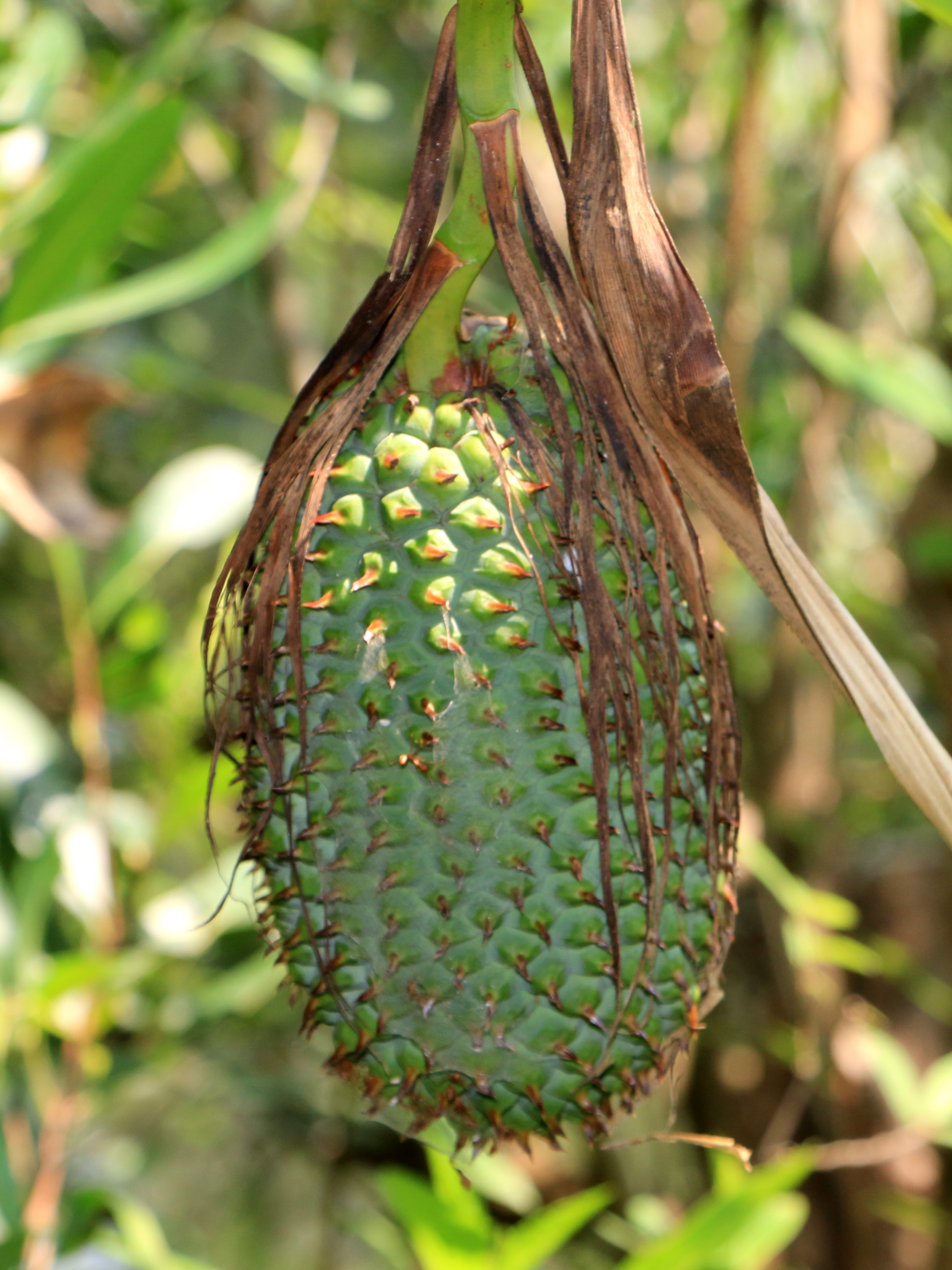
Pandanus furcatus fruit

- Pandanus fanningensis H.St.John
- Pandanus farakoensis Huynh
- Pandanus faviger Backer
- Pandanus fibrosus Gagnep.
- Pandanus fidelis H.St.John
- Pandanus flagellaris B.C.Stone
- Pandanus flagellibracteatus Huynh
- Pandanus floribundus Merr. & L.M.Perry
- Pandanus forbesii Warb.
- Pandanus forsteri C.Moore & F.Muell.
- Pandanus foveolatus Kaneh.
- Pandanus freetownensis Huynh
- Pandanus fruticosus H.St.John
- Pandanus furcatus Roxb.
- Pandanus fusinus Martelli
- Pandanus gabonensis Huynh
- Pandanus galeatus H.St.John
- Pandanus galorei B.C.Stone
- Pandanus gazelleensis H.St.John
- Pandanus gemmifer H.St.John
- Pandanus gibberosus H.St.John
- Pandanus gilbertanus Martelli
- Pandanus gillespiei H.St.John
- Pandanus gladiifolius Martelli
- Pandanus glaphyros H.St.John
- Pandanus glaucifer H.St.John
- Pandanus glaucocephalus R.E.Vaughan & Wiehe
- Pandanus globatus H.St.John
- Pandanus gossweileri H.St.John ex Huynh
- Pandanus gracilialatus H.St.John
- Pandanus gracilis Blanco
- Pandanus grallatus B.C.Stone
- Pandanus graminifolius Kurz
- Pandanus granulosus H.St.John
- Pandanus grayorum Callm., Buerki & Gallaher
- Pandanus grusonianus L.Linden & Rodigas
- Pandanus guillaumetii B.C.Stone
- Pandanus guineabissauensis Huynh

== H-K ==
- Pandanus halleorum B.C.Stone
- Pandanus halmaherensis Callm. & A.P.Keim
- Pandanus hata H.St.John
- Pandanus helicopus Kurz
- Pandanus hemisphaericus H.St.John
- Pandanus hermaphroditus Martelli
- Pandanus hermesii B.C.Stone
- Pandanus hermsianus Martelli
- Pandanus heterocarpus Balf.f.
- Pandanus hooglandii H.St.John
- Pandanus horizontalis H.St.John
- Pandanus houlletii Carrière
- Pandanus humbertii Laivao, Callm. & Buerki
- Pandanus humilior H.St.John
- Pandanus huynhii B.C.Stone
- Pandanus hystrix Martelli
- Pandanus iceryi Horne ex Balf.f.
- Pandanus ijzermannii Boerl. & Koord.
- Pandanus imerinensis Martelli
- Pandanus immersus Ridl.
- Pandanus incertus R.E.Vaughan & Wiehe
- Pandanus induratus H.St.John
- Pandanus insolitus Huynh
- Pandanus insuetus Huynh
- Pandanus intricatus Martelli & Pic.Serm.
- Pandanus involutus H.St.John
- Pandanus irregularis Ridl.
- Pandanus isalicus Huynh
- Pandanus isis H.St.John
- Pandanus iwen B.C.Stone
- Pandanus jaffrei H.St.John
- Pandanus joskei Horne ex Balf.f.
- Pandanus julianettii Martelli
- Pandanus julifer Martelli
- Pandanus kabaenaensis A.P.Keim
- Pandanus kaernbachii Warb.
- Pandanus kaida Kurz
- Pandanus kajewskii Merr. & L.M.Perry
- Pandanus kajui Beentje
- Pandanus kalobinonensis Callm., Razakamal. & Luino
- Pandanus kamiae B.C.Stone
- Pandanus kanehirae Martelli
- Pandanus katatonos H.St.John
- Pandanus kaviengensis H.St.John
- Pandanus kedahensis H.St.John
- Pandanus kerchovei L.Linden & Rodigas
- Pandanus kimlangii Callm. & Laivao
- Pandanus kinabaluensis H.St.John ex B.C.Stone
- Pandanus kirkii Rendle
- Pandanus klossii Ridl.
- Pandanus koordersii Martelli
- Pandanus korwae A.P.Keim
- Pandanus krauelianus K.Schum.
- Pandanus kuepferi Callm., Wohlh. & Laivao
- Pandanus kusaicola Kaneh.

== L ==
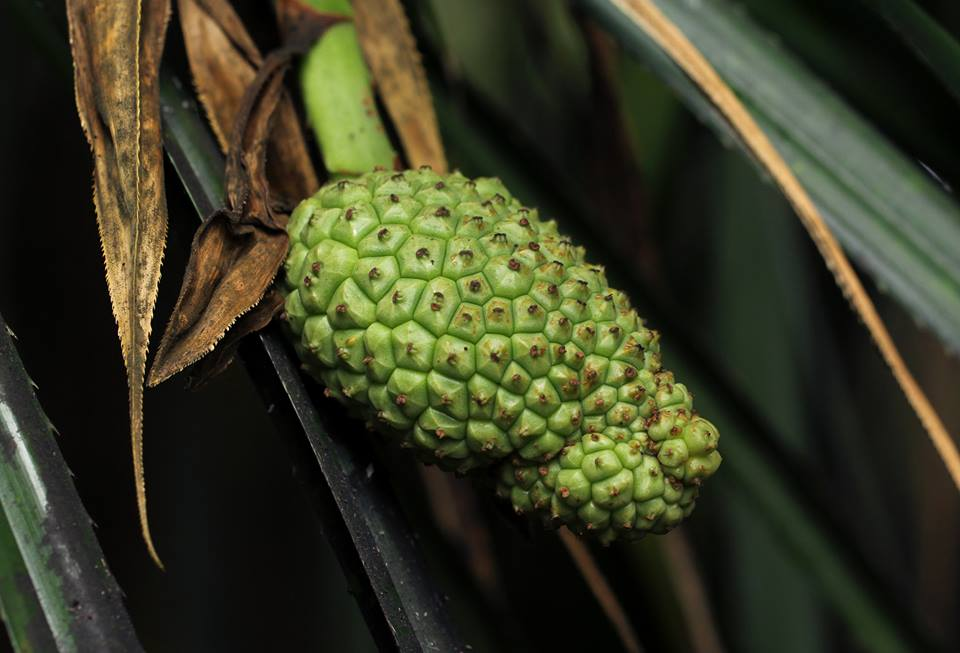
Pandanus livingstonianus fruit

- Pandanus labyrinthicus Kurz
- Pandanus lachaisei Huynh
- Pandanus lacuum H.St.John
- Pandanus laferrerei Huynh
- Pandanus lais Kurz
- Pandanus lamekotensis Markgr.
- Pandanus lamprocephalus Merr. & L.M.Perry
- Pandanus lateralis Martelli
- Pandanus laticonvexus H.St.John
- Pandanus latiloculatus Huynh
- Pandanus latistigmaticus Huynh
- Pandanus laxespicatus Martelli
- Pandanus leiophyllus Martelli
- Pandanus leonardocoi P.M.Zamora & Gruezo
- Pandanus leptocarpus Martelli
- Pandanus leptocaulis Merr. & L.M.Perry
- Pandanus leptopodus Martelli
- Pandanus leram Jones ex R.Millar
- Pandanus letocartiorum Callm. & Buerki
- Pandanus leuconotus B.C.Stone
- Pandanus levuensis Martelli
- Pandanus liberiensis Huynh
- Pandanus lifouensis H.St.John
- Pandanus ligulatus H.St.John
- Pandanus limbatus Merr. & L.M.Perry
- Pandanus linguiformis B.C.Stone
- Pandanus livingstonianus Rendle
- Pandanus loherianus Martelli
- Pandanus longicaudatus Holttum & H.St.John
- Pandanus longicuspidatus Pic.Serm.
- Pandanus longipedunculatus Fagerl.
- Pandanus longipes H.Perrier ex Martelli
- Pandanus longissimipedunculatus Martelli
- Pandanus longissimus H.St.John
- Pandanus longistylus Martelli & Pic.Serm.
- Pandanus lorencei Huynh
- Pandanus luzonensis Merr.

== M ==
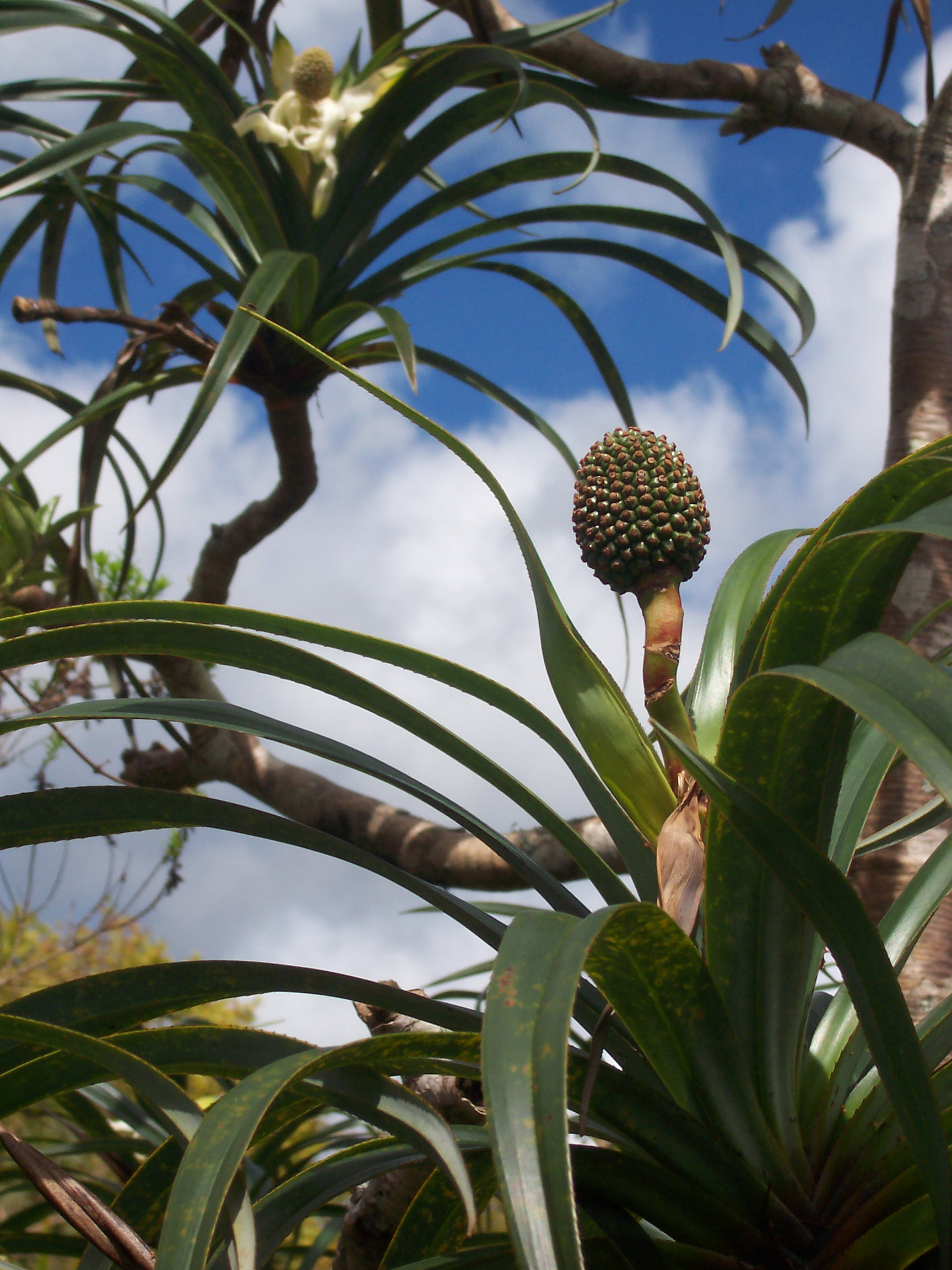
Pandanus montanus

- Pandanus macrocarpus Vieill.
- Pandanus macrophyllus Martelli
- Pandanus macrostigma Martelli
- Pandanus maevaranensis Martelli
- Pandanus magnicavernosus H.St.John
- Pandanus majungensis Huynh
- Pandanus malgassicus Pic.Serm.
- Pandanus malgrasii Huynh
- Pandanus mammillaris Martelli & Pic.Serm.
- Pandanus manamboloensis Huynh
- Pandanus manensis Martelli
- Pandanus mangalorensis Nadaf & Zanan
- Pandanus mangokensis Martelli
- Pandanus mapola Martelli
- Pandanus mareensis H.St.John
- Pandanus marginatus H.St.John
- Pandanus marinus H.St.John
- Pandanus marojejicus Callm. & Laivao
- Pandanus maromokotrensis Callm. & Wohlh.
- Pandanus martellii Elmer
- Pandanus martinianus Nadaf & Zanan
- Pandanus mauricei H.St.John
- Pandanus maximus Martelli
- Pandanus mayotteensis H.St.John
- Pandanus mc-keei H.St.John
- Pandanus medialis H.St.John
- Pandanus megacarpus Martelli
- Pandanus membranaceus Huynh
- Pandanus menicostigma Merr. & L.M.Perry
- Pandanus mesos H.St.John
- Pandanus metaceus H.St.John
- Pandanus microcarpus Balf.f.
- Pandanus microcephalus Baker
- Pandanus mindanaensis Martelli
- Pandanus minimus H.St.John
- Pandanus moalaensis H.St.John
- Pandanus monophalanx Fagerl.
- Pandanus montanus Bory
- Pandanus multibracteatus Merr.
- Pandanus multidentatus H.St.John
- Pandanus multidrupaceus H.St.John
- Pandanus multifurcatus Fagerl.
- Pandanus multispicatus Balf.f.
- Pandanus muralis Huynh
- Pandanus muricatus Thouars
- Pandanus mussauensis H.St.John
- Pandanus myriocarpus Baker

== N-O ==
- Pandanus namakiensis Martelli
- Pandanus nanofrutex B.C.Stone
- Pandanus navicularis B.C.Stone
- Pandanus nemoralis Merr. & L.M.Perry
- Pandanus neoleptopodus Pic.Serm.
- Pandanus neomecklenburgensis H.St.John
- Pandanus nepalensis H.St.John
- Pandanus nervosus B.C.Stone
- Pandanus ngunaensis H.St.John
- Pandanus nitidus (Miq.) Kurz
- Pandanus nobilis Quisumb. & Merr.
- Pandanus nogarete H.St.John
- Pandanus noumeaensis H.St.John
- Pandanus novibritannicus H.St.John
- Pandanus novohibernicus (Martelli) Martelli
- Pandanus nusbaumeri Callm. & L.Gaut.
- Pandanus obconicus H.St.John
- Pandanus obeliscus Thouars
- Pandanus oblatus H.St.John
- Pandanus oblongus (Brongn.) Balf.f.
- Pandanus obovatus H.St.John
- Pandanus obsoletus R.E.Vaughan & Wiehe
- Pandanus occultus Merr.
- Pandanus odorifer (Forssk.) Kuntze
- Pandanus oligocarpus Martelli
- Pandanus oligocephalus Baker
- Pandanus onesuaensis H.St.John
- Pandanus orculiformis Kaneh.
- Pandanus ouveaensis H.St.John
- Pandanus oviger Martelli ex Koord.

== P ==
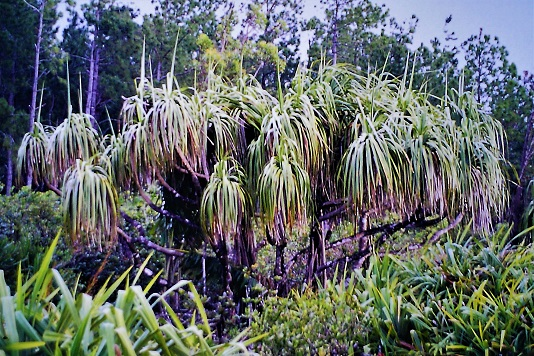
Pandanus palustris

- Pandanus palakkadensis Nadaf, Zanan & Wakte
- Pandanus palawensis Martelli
- Pandanus pallidus Merr.
- Pandanus paloensis Elmer
- Pandanus paludosus Merr. & L.M.Perry
- Pandanus palustris Thouars
- Pandanus panayensis Merr.
- Pandanus pancheri (Brongn.) Balf.f.
- Pandanus papateaensis Butaud, F.Jacq & Callm.
- Pandanus papenooensis H.St.John
- Pandanus papuanus Solms
- Pandanus paracalensis Merr.
- Pandanus parou H.St.John
- Pandanus parvicentralis Huynh
- Pandanus patelliformis Merr.
- Pandanus patina Martelli
- Pandanus peekelii H.St.John
- Pandanus penangensis Ridl.
- Pandanus pendulinus Martelli
- Pandanus penetrans H.St.John
- Pandanus penicillus Martelli
- Pandanus pentodon Ridl.
- Pandanus perrieri Martelli
- Pandanus pervilleanus (Gaudich.) Kurz
- Pandanus petrosus Martelli
- Pandanus peyrierasii B.C.Stone & Guillaumet
- Pandanus philippinensis Merr.
- Pandanus pinensis H.St.John
- Pandanus piniformis Holttum & H.St.John
- Pandanus piricus H.St.John
- Pandanus pistikos H.St.John
- Pandanus pistos H.St.John
- Pandanus pitcairnensis H.St.John
- Pandanus planatus H.St.John
- Pandanus platyphyllus Martelli
- Pandanus pleiocephalus Martelli ex Fagerl.
- Pandanus pluriaculeatus Huynh
- Pandanus pluriloculatus H.St.John
- Pandanus polyacris Martelli
- Pandanus polycephalus Lam.
- Pandanus polyglossus Martelli
- Pandanus pricei P.M.Zamora & Gruezo
- Pandanus princeps B.C.Stone
- Pandanus pristis B.C.Stone
- Pandanus prostratus Balf.f.
- Pandanus pseudobathiei Pic.Serm.
- Pandanus pseudocollinus Pic.Serm.
- Pandanus pseudolais Warb.
- Pandanus pseudomontanus Bosser & J.Guého
- Pandanus pugnax B.C.Stone
- Pandanus pukapukaensis H.St.John
- Pandanus pulcher Martelli
- Pandanus punctulatus Martelli
- Pandanus purpurascens Thouars
- Pandanus pweleensis H.St.John
- Pandanus pygmaeus Thouars
- Pandanus pyramidalis Balf.f.
- Pandanus pyramidos H.St.John

== Q-R ==
- Pandanus quadrifidus B.C.Stone
- Pandanus quinarius H.St.John
- Pandanus rabaiensis Rendle.
- Pandanus rabaulensis H.St.John
- Pandanus radicans Blanco
- Pandanus radifer H.St.John
- Pandanus ramosii Merr.
- Pandanus ramromensis Callm., Y.W.Low & Buerki
- Pandanus rapensis F.Br.
- Pandanus raynalii Huynh
- Pandanus recavilapideus H.St.John
- Pandanus recavisaxosus H.St.John
- Pandanus rechingeri Martelli
- Pandanus reclinatus Martelli
- Pandanus rectus H.St.John
- Pandanus regalis B.C.Stone
- Pandanus reineckei Warb.
- Pandanus reticulatus Vieill.
- Pandanus reticulosus H.St.John
- Pandanus retusus H.St.John
- Pandanus rex B.C.Stone
- Pandanus rheophilus B.C.Stone
- Pandanus rigidifolius R.E.Vaughan & Wiehe
- Pandanus robinsonii Merr.
- Pandanus rollotii Martelli
- Pandanus rostratus Martelli
- Pandanus rotumaensis H.St.John
- Pandanus rubricinctus H.St.John

== S ==
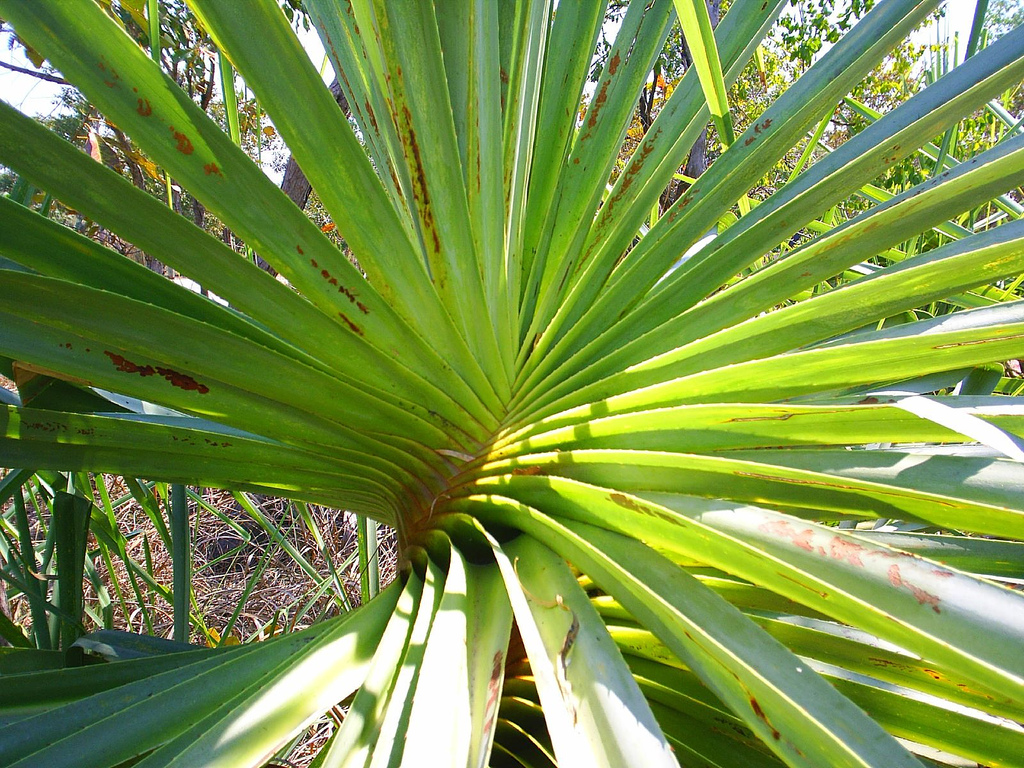
Pandanus spiralis

- Pandanus sambiranensis Martelli
- Pandanus sandakanensis Merr.
- Pandanus sarasinorum Warb.
- Pandanus satabiei Huynh
- Pandanus saxatilis Martelli
- Pandanus scabrifolius Martelli ex Koord.
- Pandanus schoddei H.St.John
- Pandanus scopula Warb.
- Pandanus scortechinii Martelli
- Pandanus sechellarum Balf.f.
- Pandanus semiarmatus H.St.John
- Pandanus semipilaris H.St.John
- Pandanus senegalensis H.St.John ex Huynh
- Pandanus sermollianus Callm. & Buerki
- Pandanus serpentinicus H.St.John
- Pandanus sibuyanensis Martelli
- Pandanus sierraleonensis Huynh
- Pandanus sikassoensis Huynh
- Pandanus silvanus Huynh
- Pandanus simplex Merr.
- Pandanus sinicola A.C.Sm.
- Pandanus solms-laubachii F.Muell.
- Pandanus solomonensis B.C.Stone
- Pandanus sparganioides Baker
- Pandanus spathulatus Martelli
- Pandanus sphaerocephalus Pancher ex Brongn.
- Pandanus sphaeroideus Thouars
- Pandanus spheniskos H.St.John
- Pandanus spicatus H.St.John
- Pandanus spinifer Warb.
- Pandanus spiralis R.Br.
- Pandanus spissus H.St.John
- Pandanus spondiophyllus B.C.Stone
- Pandanus stellatus Martelli
- Pandanus stipiformis H.St.John
- Pandanus subacaulis Merr.
- Pandanus subcylindricus H.St.John
- Pandanus subglobosus H.St.John
- Pandanus sulawesicus B.C.Stone
- Pandanus sulcatus H.St.John
- Pandanus sumatranus Martelli
- Pandanus sylvestris Bory
- Pandanus sylvicola Huynh

== T ==
- Pandanus tabellarius Huynh
- Pandanus taluucensis Callm.
- Pandanus tamaruensis J.W.Moore
- Pandanus taveuniensis H.St.John
- Pandanus tazoanii Callm. & Wohlh.
- Pandanus tectorius Parkinson
- Pandanus temehaniensis J.W.Moore
- Pandanus tenuiflagellatus Huynh
- Pandanus tenuifolius Balf.f.
- Pandanus tenuimarginatus Huynh
- Pandanus tenuipedunculatus Merr.
- Pandanus thomensis Henriq.
- Pandanus tiassaleensis Huynh
- Pandanus tolanarensis Huynh
- Pandanus toliarensis Huynh
- Pandanus tongatapuensis H.St.John
- Pandanus tonkinensis Martelli ex B.C.Stone
- Pandanus triangularis H.St.John ex Huynh
- Pandanus tsaratananensis Martelli
- Pandanus tsingycola Callm. & Nusb.
- Pandanus tubulatus Huynh
- Pandanus turritus Martelli

== U-Z ==
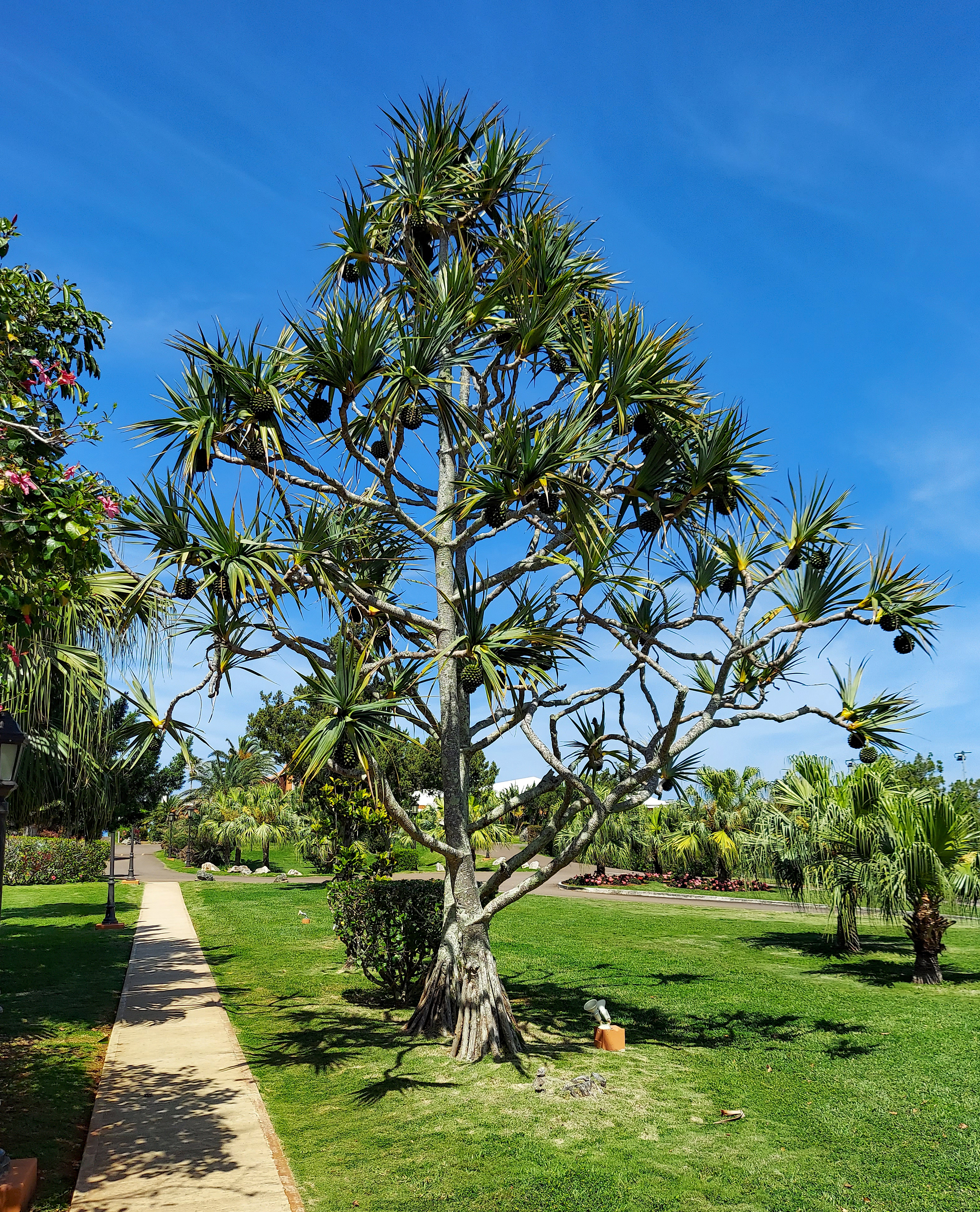
Pandanus utilis

- Pandanus umbonatus Quisumb. & Merr.
- Pandanus unguifer Hook.f.
- Pandanus unipapillatus Dennst.
- Pandanus urophyllus Hance
- Pandanus utilis Bory
- Pandanus validus Huynh & Callm.
- Pandanus vandamii Martelli & Pic.Serm.
- Pandanus vandermeeschii Balf.f.
- Pandanus variabilis Martelli
- Pandanus vavauensis H.St.John
- Pandanus veillonii H.St.John
- Pandanus verecundus B.C.Stone
- Pandanus verticalis H.St.John
- Pandanus vinaceus B.C.Stone
- Pandanus viscidus Pancher ex Brongn.
- Pandanus vitiensis Martelli
- Pandanus vogelensis H.St.John
- Pandanus voradolii Callm. & Buerki
- Pandanus welwitschii Rendle
- Pandanus whitmeeanus Martelli
- Pandanus wiehei Bosser & J.Guého
- Pandanus yandeensis H.St.John
- Pandanus yasawaensis H.St.John
- Pandanus yirrkalaensis H.St.John
- Pandanus yoshioi H.St.John
- Pandanus yuleensis H.St.John
- Pandanus yvanii Solms
- Pandanus zamboangensis Martelli
