= List of endemic plants of Aldabra =

Aldabra and adjacent coralline island groups, including the Amirante Islands, Farquhar Group, and Southern Coral Group (Coëtivy and Île Platte), are known as the Outer Islands or Coralline Seychelles. They are home to several endemic plants.

These islands are politically part of Seychelles, but World Geographical Scheme for Recording Plant Distributions (WGSRPD) treats them a separate botanical country from the Granitic Seychelles, the group of granitic islands which form the main part of the country. The Granitic Seychelles sit on the Seychelles Bank, and unlike the Outer Islands are made of granite derived from ancient continental crust.

Plants are listed alphabetically by plant family. Plants endemic to specific islands or island groups are indicated.

== Acanthaceae ==
- Hypoestes aldabrensis Baker – Aldabra

== Asphodelaceae ==
- Aloe aldabrensis (Marais) L.E.Newton & G.D.Rowley – Aldabra

== Cucurbitaceae ==
- Peponium sublitorale C.Jeffrey & J.S.Page – Aldabra

== Cyperaceae ==
- Bulbostylis basalis Fosberg – Aldabra
- Cyperus bigibbosa Fosberg – Aldabra

== Euphorbiaceae ==
- Acalypha claoxyloides Hutch. – Aldabra

== Fabaceae ==
- Chamaecrista aldabrensis (Hemsl.) Lock & H.E.Ireland – Aldabra

== Myrtaceae ==
- Eugenia levinervis Fosberg) A.J.Scott – Aldabra

== Nyctaginaceae ==
- Boerhavia crispifolia Fosberg – Aldabra

== Pandanaceae ==
- Pandanus aldabraensis H.St.John – Aldabra
- Pandanus grusonianus L.Linden & Rodigas – Amirante Islands
- Pandanus kerchovei L.Linden & Rodigas – Amirante Islands

== Phyllanthaceae ==
- Phyllanthus maderaspatensis var. frazieri Fosberg – Aldabra

== Poaceae ==
- Eragrostis decumbens Renvoize – Aldabra
- Panicum aldabrense Renvoize – Aldabra
- Sporobolus aldabrensis Renvoize – Aldabra
- Sporobolus testudinum Renvoize – Aldabra
- Stenotaphrum clavigerum Stapf – Aldabra to Assumption

== Portulacaceae ==
- Portulaca mauritiensis var. aldabrensis Fosberg – Aldabra
- Portulaca oleracea var. delicatula Fosberg – Aldabra

== Sapindaceae ==
- Allophylus aldabricus Radlk. – Aldabra

== Sapotaceae ==
- Sideroxylon inerme subsp. cryptophlebium (Baker) J.H.Hemsl. – Aldabra

== Solanaceae ==
- Solanum aldabrense C.H.Wright – Aldabra
