= Pandanus prostratus =

Scientific classification
- Kingdom: Plantae
- Clade: Tracheophytes
- Clade: Angiosperms
- Clade: Monocots
- Order: Pandanales
- Family: Pandanaceae
- Genus: Pandanus
- Species: P. prostratus

Binomial name
- Pandanus prostratus Balf.f.

Synonyms
- Pandanus conoideus Thouars

Species of plant

Pandanus prostratus ("Vacoas conique") is a species of plant in the family Pandanaceae, endemic to Mauritius.

== Description ==
A low (3-4m) branching tree, with slender, upturned branches that form a canopy. The trunk is first prostrate but becomes erect as the plant matures. Each stem is topped with a dense tuft of slender, drooping leaves. Older dead leaves are persistent around the stems just below the tuft. The leaves have white spines that are densest near the upper bit of the leaf, and darker and rarer lower down.

This species is also distinguished by its oblong fruit-heads, appearing first erect and then drooping. Each fruit-head is packed with uniseriate rows of long, narrow drupes. The exposed portions of the drupes are pale grey, and the internal portion becomes light yellow when ripe.

Occasionally this species bears more than one fruit-head on the same peduncle. This feature is normally only found in the extinct Pandanus conglomeratus.

== Habitat ==
It is endemic to Mauritius, and isolated individuals can still be found in thickets in the highlands. It often grows alongside the common and widespread Pandanus eydouxia.
