= Pandanus elatus =

Scientific classification
- Kingdom: Plantae
- Clade: Tracheophytes
- Clade: Angiosperms
- Clade: Monocots
- Order: Pandanales
- Family: Pandanaceae
- Genus: Pandanus
- Species: P. elatus

Binomial name
- Pandanus elatus Ridl.

Species of flowering plant

Pandanus elatus is a dioecious tropical plant in the screwpine genus. It is endemic to Christmas Island, an Australian territory in the north-eastern Indian Ocean. Its specific epithet comes from the Latin elatus (tall), in reference to its growth habit.

== Description ==
Pandanus elatus is an erect tree, with basal prop roots, that grows to 20 m in height. Its leaves grow to 3 m long and 100 mm wide, dark green and with marginal prickles. The plants do not form the densely tangled thickets that characterise P. christmatensis.

== Distribution and habitat ==
Found only on Christmas Island, the tree is found on deeper soils in the rainforest, sometimes in small groves.

== Taxonomy ==
The tree is closely related to P. leram Jones, of the Andaman and Nicobar Islands and the southern coasts of Sumatra and western Java.
