= Pandanus pluriloculatus =

Conservation status
- Endangered (IUCN 3.1)

Scientific classification
- Kingdom: Plantae
- Clade: Tracheophytes
- Clade: Angiosperms
- Clade: Monocots
- Order: Pandanales
- Family: Pandanaceae
- Genus: Pandanus
- Section: Pandanus sect. Acanthostyla
- Species: P. pluriloculatus

Binomial name
- Pandanus pluriloculatus H.St.John

Species of tree endemic to Madagascar

Pandanus pluriloculatus is a dioecious tree in the family Pandanaceae which is endemic to Madagascar. The specific epithet, pluriloculatus, is a reference to the numerous locules in a compound ovary.

== Description ==
Pandanus pluriloculatus is a tree up to 22 m (72 ft) tall with a dark brown bark and a spiny trunk up to 30 cm (12 in) in diameter. The crown of the tree is narrowly cylindric, with three spirals of large leaves at the top. Most of the trunk below the crown has many short branchlets with narrow leaves and fruit spikes. The leaves at the top of the tree are 1.35–1.6 m (4.4–5.2 ft) long and 10–14 cm (3.9–5.5 in) wide. The leaves of the lateral branchlets are shorter (71–83 cm or 28–33 in long), and narrower (15–16 mm or 0.59–0.63 in wide). P. pluriloculatus usually has no prop roots.

=== Flowers and fruit ===
Flowering clusters arise at the tips of the lateral branchlets. They are set on a 3-sided stalk (peduncle) 8–14 cm (3.1–5.5 in) long and 1 cm in diameter. The fruits (syncarps) are 5–9 cm (2.0–3.5 in) long and 5–6.5 cm (2.0–2.6 in) in diameter. There are usually 3 or 4 fruits crowded together with the largest at the tip. They are generally egg-shaped, although the smaller ones may be nearly round.

== Distribution and habitat ==
The trees are infrequent in coastal swampy forests. The species was first described in 1968, found along the east coast of Madagascar, in the Antalaha area. It has now been documented in Antsiranana and Toamasina provinces and in the Mananara Nord and Masoala protected areas.

== Taxonomy ==
Pandanus pluriloculatus is a member of the section Acanthostyla. Its closest relative is P. pseudobathiei Pic. Ser.
