= Pandanus incertus =

Scientific classification
- Kingdom: Plantae
- Clade: Tracheophytes
- Clade: Angiosperms
- Clade: Monocots
- Order: Pandanales
- Family: Pandanaceae
- Genus: Pandanus
- Species: P. incertus

Binomial name
- Pandanus incertus Balf.

Species of flowering plant

Pandanus incertus is a species of plant in the family Pandanaceae, endemic to Mauritius.

== Description ==
A small, low (2-3m) tree. The 11 cm-wide trunk is grey-red, and bears only a few stilt-roots near the base of the stem. The leaves are broad, reduplicate and taper off to the grooved tip. Some specimens can resemble the related species Pandanus spathulatus.

This species is most easily distinguished by its pale, 16 cm, rounded, club-like fruit-head. This is born on a bract-lined peduncle, and is regularly packed with 100-125 domed angular drupes, with deep brown cracks at their tips.

== Habitat ==
It is endemic to Mauritius, and is critically rare in its highland habitat.
