= Pandanus fanningensis =

Scientific classification
- Kingdom: Plantae
- Clade: Tracheophytes
- Clade: Angiosperms
- Clade: Monocots
- Order: Pandanales
- Family: Pandanaceae
- Genus: Pandanus
- Species: P. fanningensis

Binomial name
- Pandanus fanningensis H.St.John

Species of flowering plant

Pandanus fanningensis is a species of flowering plant in the family Pandanaceae. It is endemic to the island of Tabuaeran (Fanning Island) in the Line Islands, Kiribati.
