= Pandanus arapepe =

Conservation status
- Endangered (IUCN 3.1)

Scientific classification
- Kingdom: Plantae
- Clade: Embryophytes
- Clade: Tracheophytes
- Clade: Angiosperms
- Clade: Monocots
- Order: Pandanales
- Family: Pandanaceae
- Genus: Pandanus
- Species: P. arapepe

Binomial name
- Pandanus arapepe H.St.John

Species of flowering plant

Pandanus arapepe, known as 'Ara Pepe in Cook Islands Māori, is a species of flowering plant endemic to the Cook Islands, where it is known only from the islands of Atiu and Mauke. It is a tree which grows in lowland rain forests. Little is known about the species' population, distribution, and threats to it. The IUCN Red List assesses the species as Endangered based on its limited range and recurrent threats from typhoons and droughts.

The leaves are used locally for thatch and the flowers for leis.

The species was described by Harold St. John in 1989.
