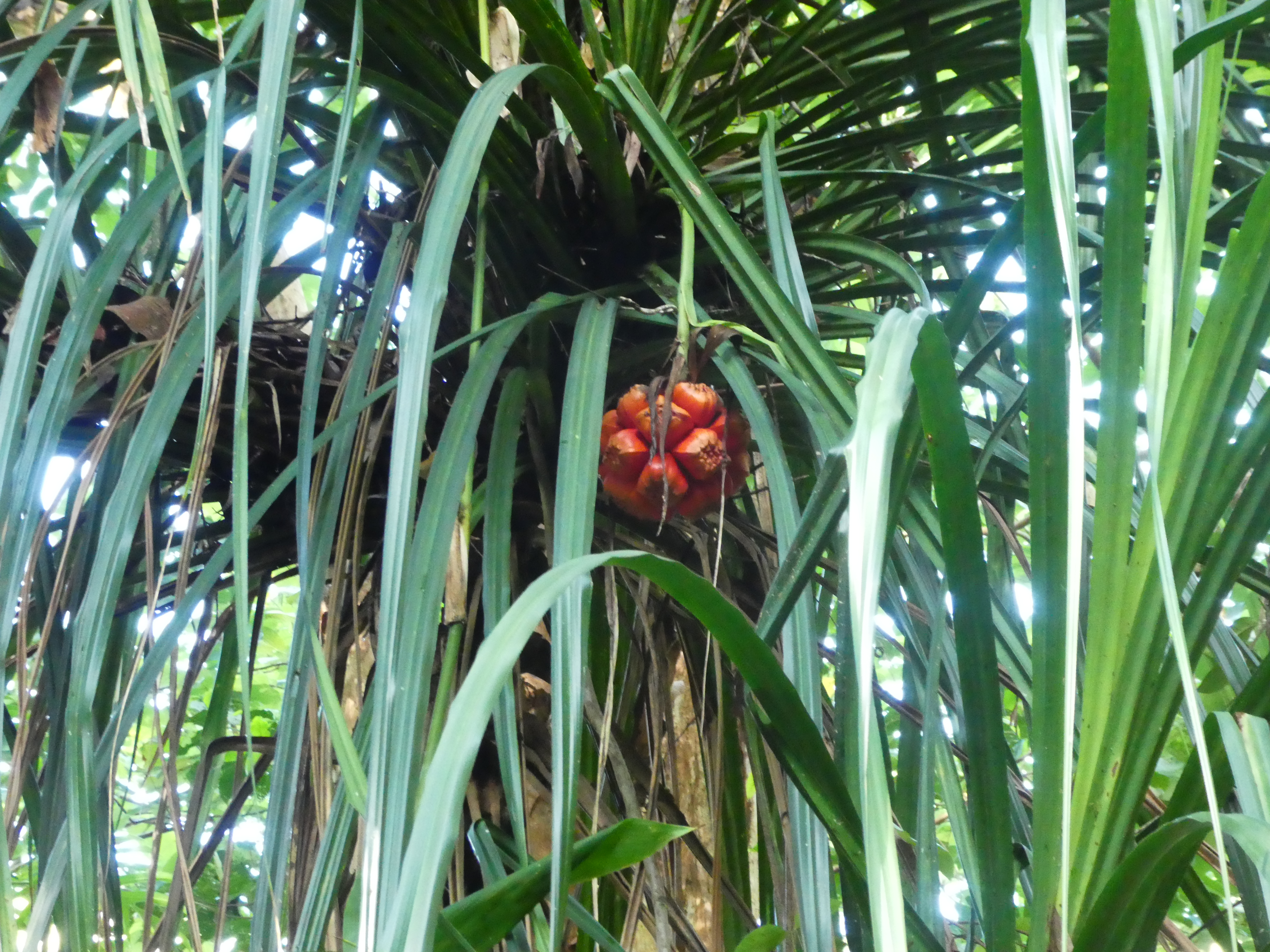
- Ripening fruit

Conservation status
- Least Concern (IUCN 3.1)

Scientific classification
- Kingdom: Plantae
- Clade: Tracheophytes
- Clade: Angiosperms
- Clade: Monocots
- Order: Pandanales
- Family: Pandanaceae
- Genus: Pandanus
- Species: P. conicus

Binomial name
- Pandanus conicus H.St.John

Synonyms
- Pandanus cochleatus H.St.John; Pandanus sphaericus H.St.John

= Pandanus conicus =

Screw palm

Species of flowering plant

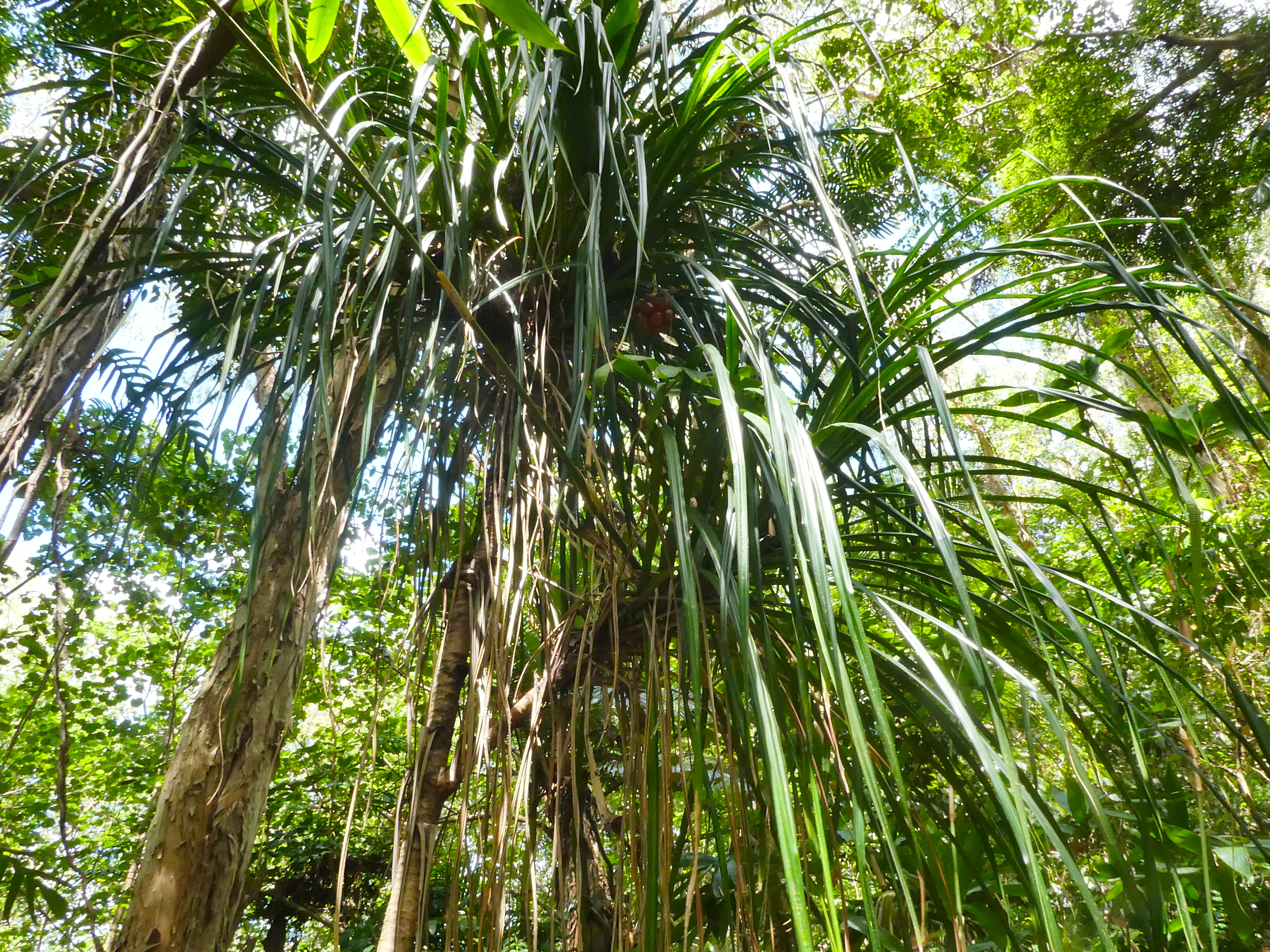
At Cairns Botanic Gardens

Pandanus conicus, commonly known as screw palm, is a species of plants in the family Pandanaceae found only in Queensland, Australia. It is a slim tree up to 10 m (33 ft) tall with spreading branches, and the trunk bears numerous small spiny "warts". The leaves may be up to 2 m (6 ft 7 in) long and 3.5 cm (1.4 in) wide, with sharp spines on the margins. They are arranged in densely clustered whorls at the ends of the branches. The plant inhabits rainforest and vine thickets on the east coast of the northern half of Cape York Peninsula, south to about Coen. This species is dioecious, meaning that pistillate (functionally female) and staminate (functionally male) flowers are borne on separate plants. It was first described in 1960 by American botanist Harold St. John.

== Conservation ==
This species has been assessed to be of least concern by the International Union for Conservation of Nature (IUCN) and by the Queensland Government under its Nature Conservation Act.
