= Pandanus papenooensis =

Conservation status
- Least Concern (IUCN 3.1)

Scientific classification
- Kingdom: Plantae
- Clade: Embryophytes
- Clade: Tracheophytes
- Clade: Angiosperms
- Clade: Monocots
- Order: Pandanales
- Family: Pandanaceae
- Genus: Pandanus
- Species: P. papenooensis

Binomial name
- Pandanus papenooensis H.St.John (1980)

Species of flowering plant

Pandanus papenooensis is a species of flowering plant in the family Pandanaceae. It is a tree endemic to the island of Tahiti in the Society Islands of French Polynesia.
