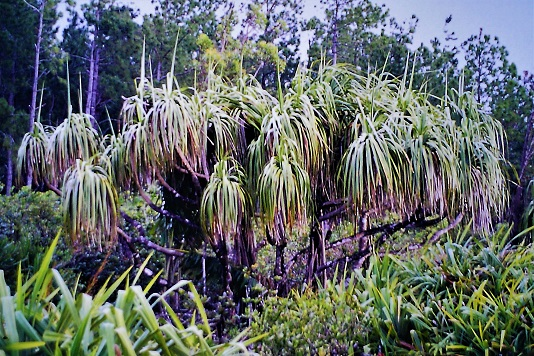

Conservation status
- Critically Endangered (IUCN 2.3)

Scientific classification
- Kingdom: Plantae
- Clade: Tracheophytes
- Clade: Angiosperms
- Clade: Monocots
- Order: Pandanales
- Family: Pandanaceae
- Genus: Pandanus
- Species: P. palustris

Binomial name
- Pandanus palustris Thouars

Synonyms
- Vinsonia palustris (Thouars) Gaudich.

= Pandanus palustris =

Species of flowering plant

Pandanus palustris ("Vacoas des marais") is a species of plant in the family Pandanaceae, endemic to Mauritius. It was once common in marshes and in the wetter highlands of Mauritius, but is now threatened by habitat loss.

== Description ==
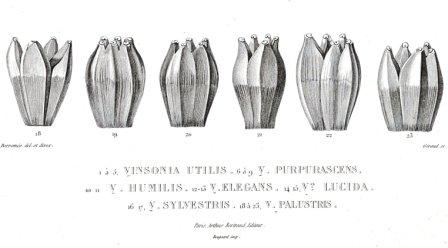
Drupes of Pandanus palustris (far right). Illustration from 1836 to 1837.

A tall (8–10 m), erect, solitary tree, with a large, dense rosette of slender, drooping, pale-green leaves. The leaf margins are completely lined with tiny cream coloured spines, that often develop brown tips. Older leaves are persistent at the base of the rosette.

This species can also be distinguished from its closest relatives by its very large, round fruit-heads, which are partially enclosed in protective leafy bracts. Each fruit-head is packed with 40-60 drupes. Each enormous, green-brown, 3-6-locular drupe has a raised, pyramid-like free portion, and has a deeply cleft tip. The drupe is also topped by large (6-10mm wide), irregular, fleshy stigmas. Similar to Pandanus pyramidalis, the joined portion of the drupes inside the fruit-head becomes light-yellow when ripe.
