= Pandanus columnaris =

Conservation status
- Endangered (IUCN 3.1)

Scientific classification
- Kingdom: Plantae
- Clade: Tracheophytes
- Clade: Angiosperms
- Clade: Monocots
- Order: Pandanales
- Family: Pandanaceae
- Genus: Pandanus
- Section: Pandanus sect. Acanthostyla
- Species: P. columnaris

Binomial name
- Pandanus columnaris H.St.John

Species of flowering plant

Pandanus columnaris is a dioecious tree in the family Pandanaceae, endemic to Madagascar. The specific epithet, "columnaris", refers to the columnar shape of the crown of the tree.

== Description ==
Pandanus columnaris is a columnar tree, up to 20 m (66 ft) tall, with light brown bark and a spiny trunk up to 25 cm (9.8 in) in diameter. The crown of the tree is cylindric, with spirals of large leaves at the top and with short secondary branchlets below. The terminal leaves may be more than 2 m (6 ft 7 in) long and 24 cm (9.4 in) wide near the base. The lateral branchlets are 2–2.5 cm (0.79–0.98 in) in diameter and spiny, with leaves that are shorter and narrower – up to 1.2 m (3 ft 11 in) long and 22 mm (0.87 in) wide – than the terminal leaves. Unlike many species of pandanus, P. columnaris has few to no prop roots.

=== Flowers and fruit ===
On male trees, the flowers are made up of yellow spikes and form on the lateral branchlets. Styles and stigmas of female flowers are both 7 mm (0.28 in) long. Fruits (drupes) are 20–22 mm (0.79–0.87 in) long, 10–15 mm (0.39–0.59 in) wide and broadly egg-shaped.

== Distribution and habitat ==
The trees are infrequent in coastal forests. The species was first described in 1961, found along the east coast of Madagascar, in the Antalaha area.

== Taxonomy ==
Pandanus columnaris is a member of the section Acanthostyla. Its closest relative is P. mangokensis Martelli.
