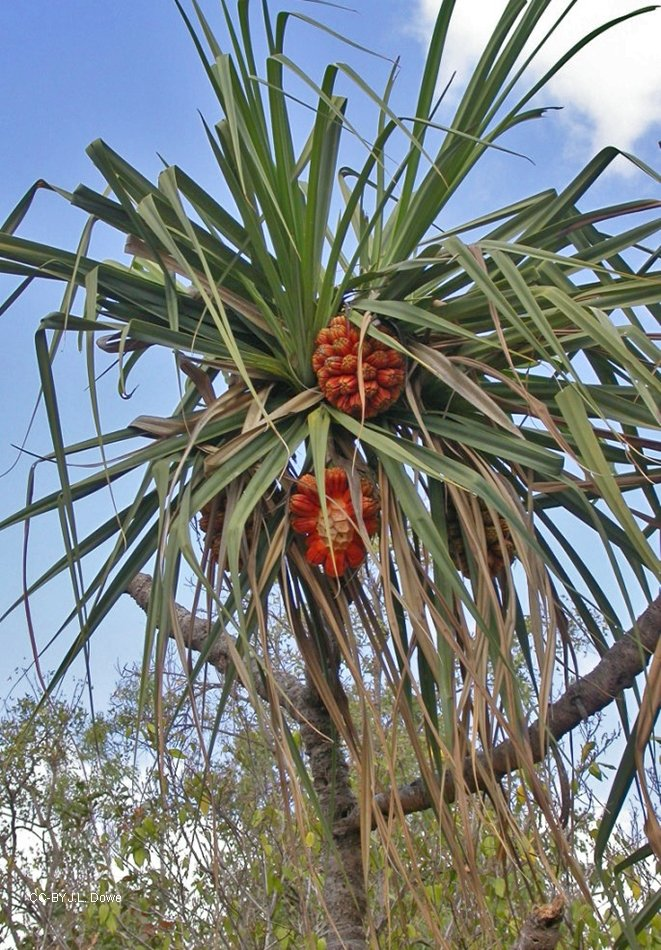

Conservation status
- Least Concern (NCA)
- Least Concern (IUCN 3.1)

Scientific classification
- Kingdom: Plantae
- Clade: Tracheophytes
- Clade: Angiosperms
- Clade: Monocots
- Order: Pandanales
- Family: Pandanaceae
- Genus: Pandanus
- Species: P. cookii

Binomial name
- Pandanus cookii Martelli

Synonyms
- List: Pandanus angulatus H.St.John; Pandanus australiensis H.St.John; Pandanus endeavourensis H.St.John; Pandanus exarmatus H.St.John; Pandanus ferrimontanus H.St.John; Pandanus humifer H.St.John; Pandanus kennedyensis H.St.John; Pandanus pluriangulatus H.St.John; Pandanus subinermis H.St.John; Pandanus truncatus H.St.John; Pandanus whitei Martelli

= Pandanus cookii =

Cook's pandan

Species of flowering plant

Pandanus cookii, commonly known as Cook's pandan, Cook's screwpine or simply screwpine, is a tree in the family Pandanaceae which is endemic to coastal and sub-coastal parts of tropical Queensland, Australia. It grows to around 10 m (33 ft) in height with an open habit, long narrow leaves up to 180 by 8 cm (70.9 by 3.1 in) and prop roots up to around 30 cm (12 in) long.

== Taxonomy ==
This species was first described by the Italian botanist Ugolino Martelli in a paper titled Le specie e varieta nuove di "Pandanus" menzionate nella enumerazione delle Pandanaceae. It was published in the journal Webbia in 1914. Martelli's description was based on material collected in 1904 by a Mr. Dempsey near Cooktown.

=== Etymology ===
The species is named after the English explorer Captain James Cook, who in 1770 was forced to spend some time in an inlet now known as the Endeavour River to repair his ship. The town of Cooktown was established on the banks of that river in 1873, and it was in this area that the type specimen was collected and provided to Martinelli. (Note: Martinelli wrote: Habitat. — Australia: Nord Queensland (H. Berol.). — Nella mia collezione vi è un bellissimo esemplare inviatomi nel 1904 dal missionario Dempsey raccolto nei dintorni di Cook Town., which translates to "Habitat. — Australia: North Queensland (H. Berol.). — In my collection there is a beautiful specimen sent to me in 1904 by the missionary Dempsey collected near Cook Town.")

== Conservation ==
This species is listed by both the Queensland Department of Environment and Science and the International Union for Conservation of Nature (IUCN) as least concern. In the statement supporting their assessment, the IUCN states "This tree species has a wide distribution and is not currently experiencing any major threats and no significant future threats have been identified. This species is therefore assessed as Least Concern." The Queensland Department of Environment and Science has not provided a statement in support of its assessment.

== Gallery ==
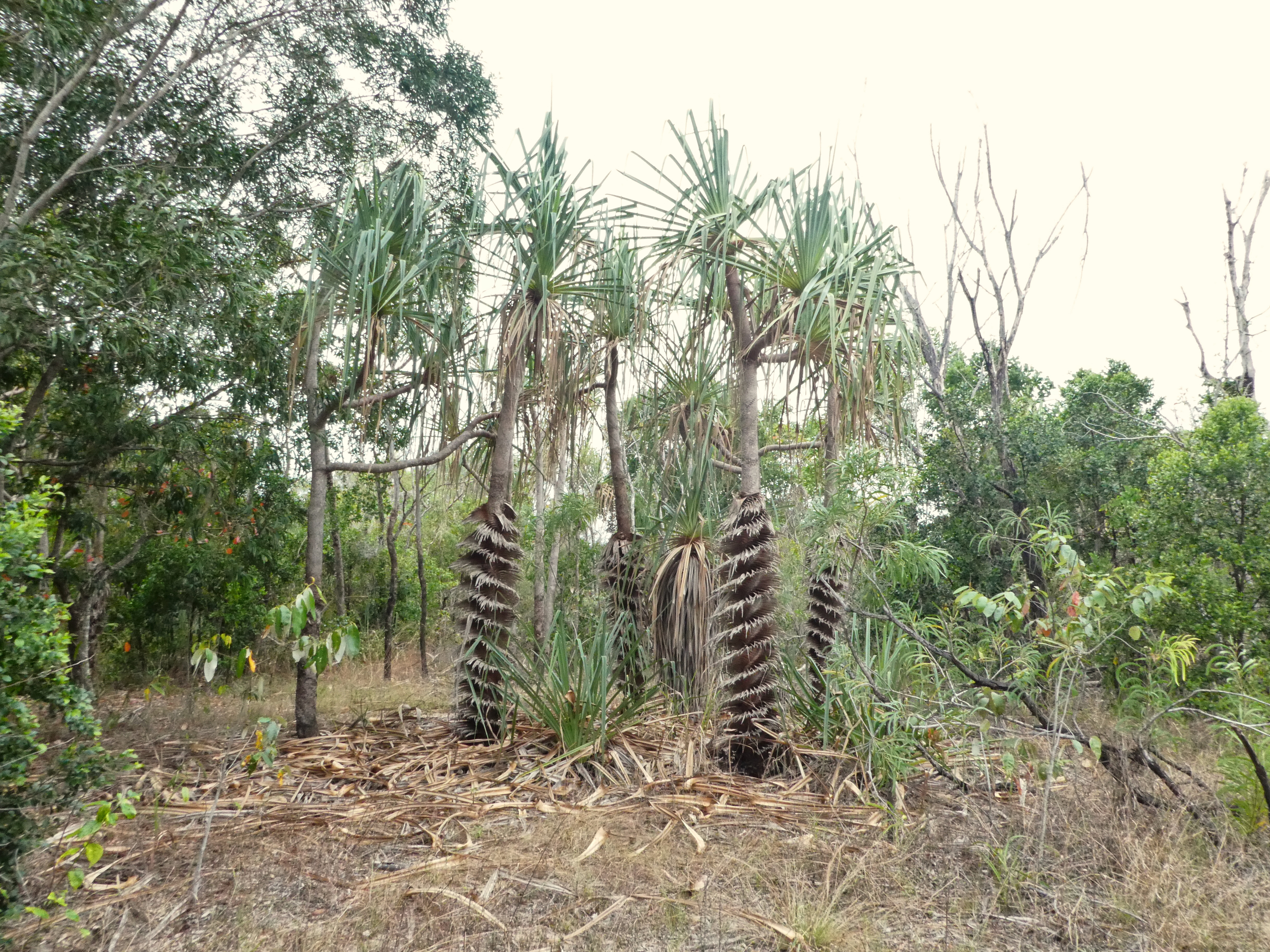
Habit

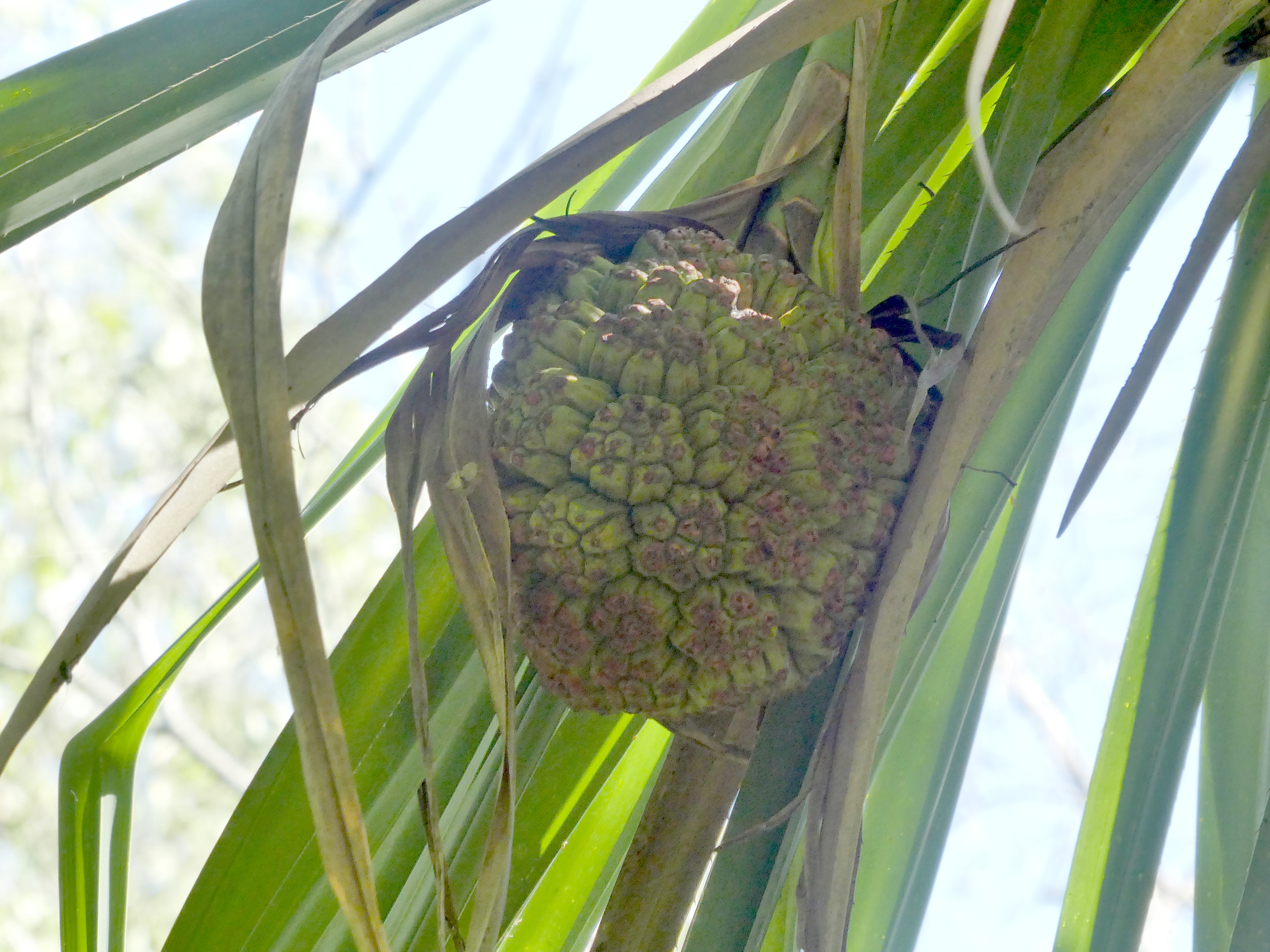
Unripe fruit

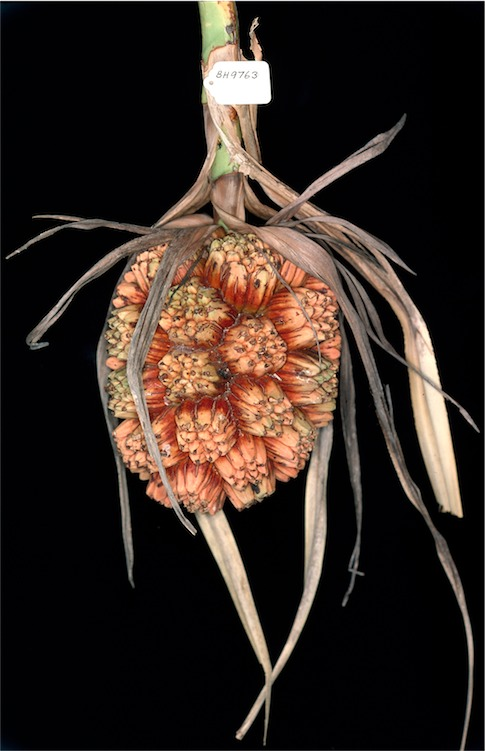
Ripe fruit

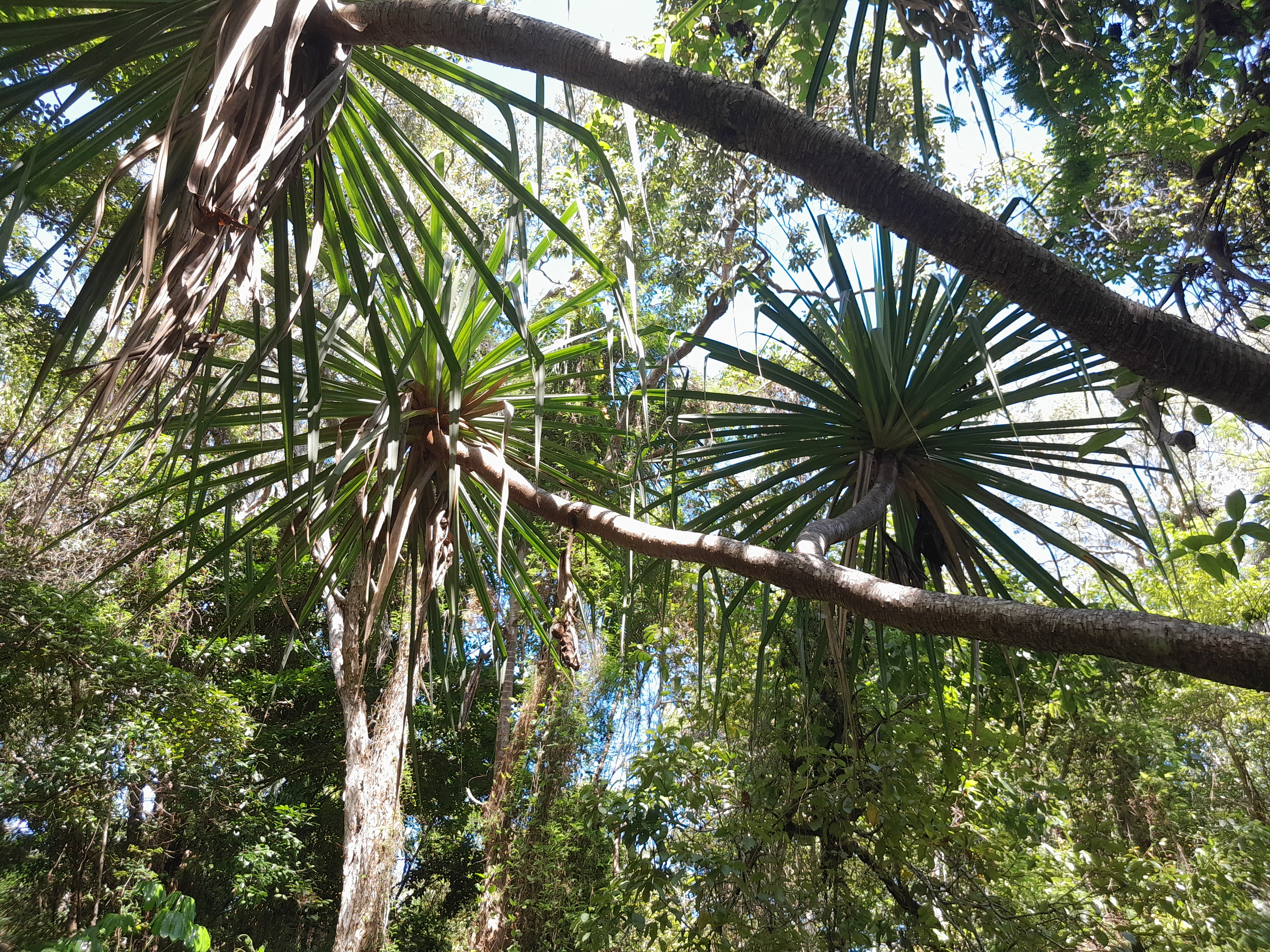
Foliage
