= Pandanus subglobosus =

Scientific classification
- Kingdom: Plantae
- Clade: Tracheophytes
- Clade: Angiosperms
- Clade: Monocots
- Order: Pandanales
- Family: Pandanaceae
- Genus: Pandanus
- Species: P. subglobosus

Binomial name
- Pandanus subglobosus H.St.John

Species of plant

Pandanus subglobosus is a dioecious tropical shrub in the screwpine genus. It is endemic to Madagascar. The specific epithet, "subglobosus", refers to the nearly-round fruits. The accepted name for this species is now Pandanus oligocarpus.

== Description ==
Pandanus subglobosus is a shrub with main stems green to gray, 5 – 7 m tall, 3 – 4 cm in diameter and studded with rough points. The stems are supported by numerous 2 – 3 m long prop roots that are about 2 cm in diameter. Leaves are up to 40 cm long and 4 – 7 mm wide, green above and pale below with dark green veins.

=== Flowers and fruit ===
Flower clusters develop at the tip of the stem. Female flower clusters produce a single, complex fruit, a syncarp, 3.5–4 cm in diameter. It is nearly round (globose) and made up of (5)-6-(7) green drupes.

== Distribution and habitat ==
Infrequent in low scrub forests of dry sand plains. The species was first described in 1961, found along the northwest coast of Madagascar, in the Majunga area.

== Taxonomy ==
Pandanus subglobosus is a member of the section Microstigma. Its closest relative is P. oligocarpus Martelli.
