= Pandanus leram =

Scientific classification
- Kingdom: Plantae
- Clade: Tracheophytes
- Clade: Angiosperms
- Clade: Monocots
- Order: Pandanales
- Family: Pandanaceae
- Genus: Pandanus
- Species: P. leram

Binomial name
- Pandanus leram Jones ex R.Millar

Synonyms
- Pandanus millore Roxb.; Pandanus andamanensium Kurz; Pandanus indicus (Gaudich.) Warb.; Pandanus leram Jones, nom. provis.; Pandanus mellori Boden-Kloss; Roussinia indica Gaudich.

Species of flowering plant

Pandanus leram is a pandan or screw pine, belonging to the family Pandanaceae. It is native to the Andaman Islands and Nicobar Islands south of Myanmar, and the southern coasts of Sumatra and western Java, in Indonesia.

The tree grows up to 21 m (69 ft) in height (exceeded only by Pandanus julienettei and Pandanus antaresensis, both of New Guinea). The linear leaves are up to 5.5 m (18 ft) long and 12.5 cm (4.9 in) in width (exceeded only by Pandanus laxespicatus).

The fruit, termed a "syncardium", (a type of multiple fruit) weighs 14–18 kg (31–40 lb) and be up to thirty inches (76 centimeters) in length.
