= Pandanus connatus =

Conservation status
- Endangered (IUCN 3.1)

Scientific classification
- Kingdom: Plantae
- Clade: Tracheophytes
- Clade: Angiosperms
- Clade: Monocots
- Order: Pandanales
- Family: Pandanaceae
- Genus: Pandanus
- Species: P. connatus

Binomial name
- Pandanus connatus H.St.John

Synonyms
- Pandanus acuminatus Hort. ex Wendl.

Species of plant

Pandanus connatus is a species of plant in the family Pandanaceae native to northern Madagascar.

== Description ==
Pandanus connatus is a shrub to small tree, growing 8 to 10 m tall with a narrow, dark brown trunk <10 cm in diameter and armed with spines that are short and cone-shaped. This is a species of Pandanus with no prop roots and only short, narrow branches to 2.5 cm in diameter. Leaves are thick, arching, 90-110 cm long, dark green above and light green below. They are about 2 cm wide, narrowing to an awl-shaped tip. Female flower clusters are erect and set on an 8 cm long stalk (peduncle) at the ends of the branches. They develop into a rounded complex fruit (syncarp) that is solitary and 9.5 cm in diameter. Seeds are narrowly oval in outline and 10-12 mm long. Flowering and fruiting occurs from July to September.

== Range and habitat ==
Pandanus connatus is a species of dry to subhumid forests. It is endemic to northern Madagascar, where it is known from 4 subpopulations and is found in Montagne d'Ambre and Loky Manambato protected areas.

== Conservation and threats ==
It is considered endangered because populations are fragmented and decreasing, with ongoing loss of mature individuals. Main threats are listed as habitat loss due to mining and quarrying as well as direct logging, harvesting for charcoal production and habitat alteration from changes to the natural fire regime.
