= Pandanus aldabraensis =

Conservation status
- Vulnerable (IUCN 2.3)

Scientific classification
- Kingdom: Plantae
- Clade: Tracheophytes
- Clade: Angiosperms
- Clade: Monocots
- Order: Pandanales
- Family: Pandanaceae
- Genus: Pandanus
- Species: P. aldabraensis

Binomial name
- Pandanus aldabraensis H.St.John (1974)

Species of tree

Pandanus aldabraensis is a species of plant in the family Pandanaceae. It is endemic to Aldabra in the Seychelles. It is threatened by habitat loss.
