= Pandanus tonkinensis =

Scientific classification
- Kingdom: Plantae
- Clade: Tracheophytes
- Clade: Angiosperms
- Clade: Monocots
- Order: Pandanales
- Family: Pandanaceae
- Genus: Pandanus
- Species: P. tonkinensis

Binomial name
- Pandanus tonkinensis B.C. Stone

Synonyms
- Pandanus nanofrutex Martelli, invalid, no Latin diagnosis

Species of flowering plant

Pandanus tonkinensis is a plant species endemic to Vietnam.

Pandanus tonkinensis is one of the smaller members of the genus. It has leaves up to 90 cm long. Inflorescence is terminal.
