= Pandanus brookei =

Scientific classification
- Kingdom: Plantae
- Clade: Tracheophytes
- Clade: Angiosperms
- Clade: Monocots
- Order: Pandanales
- Family: Pandanaceae
- Genus: Pandanus
- Species: P. brookei

Binomial name
- Pandanus brookei Martelli

Synonyms
- Pandanus cordatus H.St.John; Pandanus somersetensis H.St.John

Species of plant

Pandanus brookei a species of plant in the family Pandanaceae. It is native to Queensland. Sometimes called screw pine, this tree can reach 7-10 meters tall.
