= Pandanus verecundus =

Conservation status
- Endangered (IUCN 3.1)

Scientific classification
- Kingdom: Plantae
- Clade: Tracheophytes
- Clade: Angiosperms
- Clade: Monocots
- Order: Pandanales
- Family: Pandanaceae
- Genus: Pandanus
- Species: P. verecundus

Binomial name
- Pandanus verecundus Stone

Species of flowering plant

Pandanus verecundus is a species of plant in the family Pandanaceae. It is endemic to New Caledonia.
