= Pandanus kajui =

Conservation status
- Endangered (IUCN 3.1)

Scientific classification
- Kingdom: Plantae
- Clade: Tracheophytes
- Clade: Angiosperms
- Clade: Monocots
- Order: Pandanales
- Family: Pandanaceae
- Genus: Pandanus
- Species: P. kajui

Binomial name
- Pandanus kajui Beentje

Species of plant endemic to Kenya

Pandanus kajui is a species of flowering plant in the family Pandanaceae. It is endemic to Kenya.
