= Pandanus gilbertanus =

Scientific classification
- Kingdom: Plantae
- Clade: Tracheophytes
- Clade: Angiosperms
- Clade: Monocots
- Order: Pandanales
- Family: Pandanaceae
- Genus: Pandanus
- Species: P. gilbertanus

Binomial name
- Pandanus gilbertanus Martelli

Species of flowering plant

Pandanus gilbertanus is a species of flowering plant in the family Pandanaceae. It is endemic to the Gilbert Islands in Kiribati.
