= Pandanus whitmeeanus =

Conservation status
- Data Deficient (IUCN 3.1)

Scientific classification
- Kingdom: Plantae
- Clade: Embryophytes
- Clade: Tracheophytes
- Clade: Angiosperms
- Clade: Monocots
- Order: Pandanales
- Family: Pandanaceae
- Genus: Pandanus
- Species: P. whitmeeanus

Binomial name
- Pandanus whitmeeanus Martelli

Synonyms
- Pandanus corallinus Martelli

Species of plant

Pandanus whitmeeanus, commonly known as the Samoan pandanus, is a species of Pandanus (screwpine) believed to be native to Vanuatu. It has been introduced to Samoa, Tonga, the Cook Islands, and the Hoorn Islands by Austronesian voyagers. It is also known in Samoan and Tongan as ‘ara ‘āmoa or paogo.

== Taxonomy ==
Pandanus whitmeeanus was first described in 1905 by the Italian botanist Ugolino Martelli. It is the type species of the section Coronata and is unique among all other Pandanus species in that has centripetally arranged stigmata.

== Description ==
The tree grows to around 8 m (26 ft) tall and 20 cm (7.9 in) in width. The leaves are around 2 m (6.6 ft) long. The fruits are nearly round in shape and are around 21 by 22 cm (8.3 by 8.7 in) in size.

== Uses ==
The leaves are woven into mats, baskets, and other handicrafts. The fruits are edible.

== See also ==
- Pandanus amaryllifolius
- Pandanus odoratissimus
- Pandanus utilis
- Domesticated plants and animals of Austronesia
