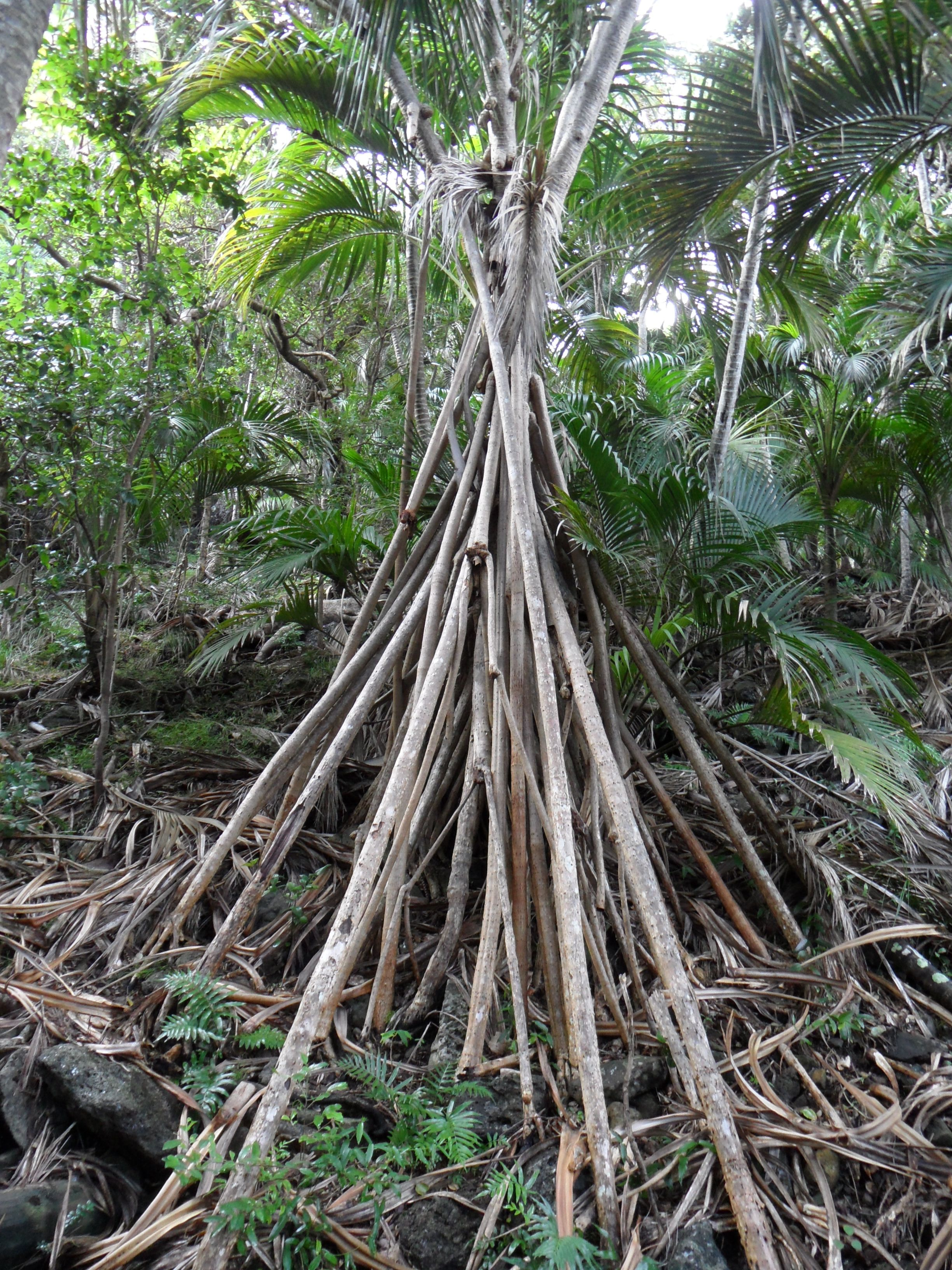

Scientific classification
- Kingdom: Plantae
- Clade: Tracheophytes
- Clade: Angiosperms
- Clade: Monocots
- Order: Pandanales
- Family: Pandanaceae
- Genus: Pandanus
- Species: P. forsteri

Binomial name
- Pandanus forsteri C.Moore & F.Muell. (1874)

= Pandanus forsteri =

Species of tree

Pandanus forsteri, commonly known as forky-tree or forkedy-tree, is a flowering plant in the screwpine family. The specific epithet honours either Johann Forster or Georg Forster, father and son German botanists, who accompanied James Cook as naturalists on his second voyage (1772–1775).

== Description ==
P. forsteri can grow to 15 m in height and is characterised by wart-like outgrowths and aerial roots up to 5 m long. The strap-shaped leaves are 1–1.5 m long and 3–5 cm wide, spiny along the edges and beneath the midrib. The tiny female flowers are covered by leaves; male flowers are borne on 50 cm long inflorescences enclosed in white bracts enclosed by a large sheath or spathe. The fruits are dense spheroidal clusters about 20 cm across, red when ripe. The flowering season is from December to April.

P. forsteri is notably taller than other species of Pandanus, and it takes years for its aerial roots to reach the ground. Its leaves function as gutters, channeling water to the trunk, and grooves in the upper surface of the roots carry water to the tips of the aerial roots where it can be absorbed.

== Distribution and habitat ==
The species is endemic to Australia’s subtropical Lord Howe Island in the Tasman Sea, where it is common from sea level to an elevation of about 400 m.
