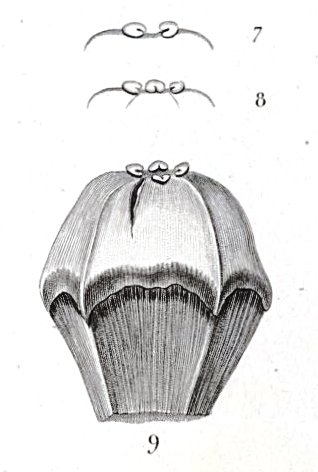
- Drupes of Pandanus purpurascens

Scientific classification
- Kingdom: Plantae
- Clade: Tracheophytes
- Clade: Angiosperms
- Clade: Monocots
- Order: Pandanales
- Family: Pandanaceae
- Genus: Pandanus
- Species: P. purpurascens

Binomial name
- Pandanus purpurascens Thouars

Synonyms
- Dorystigma mauritianum Gaudich.; Pandanus mauritianus (Gaudich.) Warb.; Vinsonia purpurascens (Thouars) Gaudich.

= Pandanus purpurascens =

Species of flowering plant

Pandanus purpurascens a species of plant in the family Pandanaceae. It is native to Réunion. Some sources list Pandanus madagascariensis as a synonym of the accepted name P. purpurascens, while other sources list Pandanus concretus as the accepted name for P. madagascariensis.
