= Pandanus ceylanicus =

Scientific classification
- Kingdom: Plantae
- Clade: Tracheophytes
- Clade: Angiosperms
- Clade: Monocots
- Order: Pandanales
- Family: Pandanaceae
- Genus: Pandanus
- Species: P. ceylanicus

Binomial name
- Pandanus ceylanicus Solms

Synonyms
- Pandanus porrittianus Martelli

Species of shrub

Pandanus ceylanicus is a monocot species of plant in the family Pandanaceae. It is endemic to Sri Lanka. It is a prostrate shrub.

== Sources ==
- http://www.theplantlist.org/tpl/record/kew-285792
