= Pandanus decipiens =

Conservation status
- Vulnerable (IUCN 2.3)

Scientific classification
- Kingdom: Plantae
- Clade: Tracheophytes
- Clade: Angiosperms
- Clade: Monocots
- Order: Pandanales
- Family: Pandanaceae
- Genus: Pandanus
- Species: P. decipiens

Binomial name
- Pandanus decipiens Martelli

Species of flowering plant

Pandanus decipiens is a species of plant in the family Pandanaceae. It is endemic to the Philippines.
