= Pandanus carmichaelii =

Conservation status
- Critically Endangered (IUCN 2.3)

Scientific classification
- Kingdom: Plantae
- Clade: Tracheophytes
- Clade: Angiosperms
- Clade: Monocots
- Order: Pandanales
- Family: Pandanaceae
- Genus: Pandanus
- Species: P. carmichaelii

Binomial name
- Pandanus carmichaelii Vaughan & Wiehe

Species of flowering plant

Pandanus carmichaelii is a species of plant in the family Pandanaceae. It is endemic to Mauritius.

== Description ==
It can be distinguished from many of its closest relatives by its small, round fruit-head (15 cm), which is partially enclosed in protective bracts . The 125-150 drupes in the fruit-head do not protrude from the surface, but are a bit compressed, with flat stigmas, and exposed tips that are flat and angular.

Its leaves are rigid and curved upwards, with abrupt, acute tips.

== Habitat ==
Its natural habitat is swamps. It is threatened by habitat loss and only survives in the high altitude area around Le Petrin.
