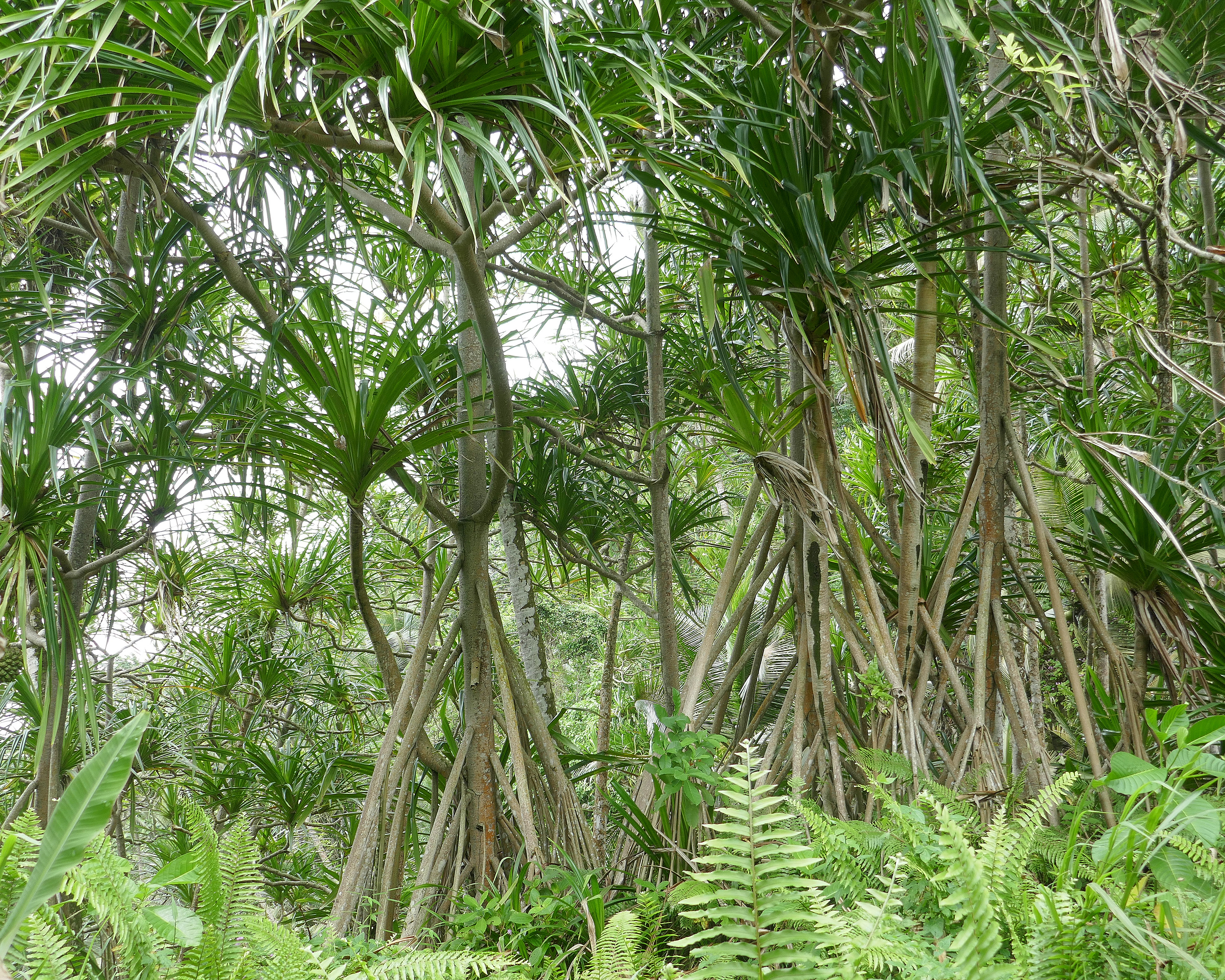

Conservation status
- Vulnerable (IUCN 2.3)

Scientific classification
- Kingdom: Plantae
- Clade: Tracheophytes
- Clade: Angiosperms
- Clade: Monocots
- Order: Pandanales
- Family: Pandanaceae
- Genus: Pandanus
- Species: P. thomensis

Binomial name
- Pandanus thomensis Henriq.

= Pandanus thomensis =

Species of tree

Pandanus thomensis is a species of trees in the family Pandanaceae. It is endemic to São Tomé Island.
