= Pandanus spicatus =

Conservation status
- Critically Endangered (IUCN 3.1)

Scientific classification
- Kingdom: Plantae
- Clade: Tracheophytes
- Clade: Angiosperms
- Clade: Monocots
- Order: Pandanales
- Family: Pandanaceae
- Genus: Pandanus
- Species: P. spicatus

Binomial name
- Pandanus spicatus H.St.John

Species of plant

Pandanus spicatus a species of plant in the family Pandanaceae. It is native to Madagascar.

== Description ==
Pandanus spicatus is a small tree first collected in 1961 in dense moist forests of northern Madagascar. It grows to 8 m tall, with a 15 cm diameter trunk and no prop roots. Several suberect branches grow from the top of the tree. These are 15 cm in diameter with broad conic spines and covered with persistent leaf bases. Leaves are thick and leathery, up to 3 m long and 15–16.5 cm wide. Fruiting structures are terminal, stand erect and have up to 9 complex fruits (syncarps), concealed in erect or ascending leaves. Fruits are egg-shaped, 9 cm long and 7 cm in diameter. It produces flowers and fruits in August, September, and November.

== Range and habitat ==
It is known from only one locality, Amber Mountain National Park and the associated Amber Forest Reserve, in northern Madagascar. There are two known subpopulations.

It lives in montane humid and subhumid evergreen forests between 990 and 1,230 meters elevation.
