= Pandanus latiloculatus =

Scientific classification
- Kingdom: Plantae
- Clade: Tracheophytes
- Clade: Angiosperms
- Clade: Monocots
- Order: Pandanales
- Family: Pandanaceae
- Genus: Pandanus
- Species: P. latiloculatus

Binomial name
- Pandanus latiloculatus Huynh

Species of plant

Pandanus latiloculatus is a species of plant in the Pandanaceae family.

== Distribution ==
It is endemic to Cameroon.

== Description ==
Pandanus latiloculatus (screwpine) are large candelabra shaped trees, which grow to 15-20 meters tall. They are prevalent in swamp or wetland forest.

== Taxonomy ==
It was named by Kim-Lang Huynh in Botanica Helvetica 101(1): 248, in 1991.
