= Pandanus aridus =

Conservation status
- Near Threatened (IUCN 3.1),

Scientific classification
- Kingdom: Plantae
- Clade: Tracheophytes
- Clade: Angiosperms
- Clade: Monocots
- Order: Pandanales
- Family: Pandanaceae
- Genus: Pandanus
- Species: P. aridus

Binomial name
- Pandanus aridus H.St.John

Species of plant

Pandanus aridus is a species of shrub or small tree in the family Pandanaceae. It is native and endemic to Madagascar, found in fragmented locations in the southern third of the country. Pandanus aridus H. St. John is the accepted name, with a synonym of Pandanus toliarensis Huynh.

== Description ==
This is a many-stemmed shrub growing to about 7 m tall with stems about 4 cm in diameter. Plants have few, relatively short (20-30 cm) and narrow (2 cm) prop roots. Leaves are somewhat leathery, 16-20 mm wide and 35-45 cm long. They are dark green above and pale green below. Starting at about 2 cm from the base, the leave edges are armed with brown-tipped white teeth 2+mm long.

=== Flowers and fruit ===
Plants are dioecious. Female flowers are borne in erect flower clusters at branch tips. Flower clusters develop into a single fruit (syncarp). Fruits are green, rounded and 5.5 to 6 cm in diameter.

== Distribution and habitat ==
Found in subarid forests and thicket in south and south-west Madagascar.

== Conservation status ==
With 15 subpopulations in 12 locations and found in several protected areas, the species status is just above the “Threatened” threshold. Populations are however are fragmented and habitat loss is ongoing, so this species has been assessed as "Near Threatened". Threats include wildfire and clearing of native habitats for agriculture or mining as well as direct harvest for wood or charcoal production.

== Taxonomy ==
Pandanus aridus is a member of the section Mammillarisia. P. saxatilis Martelli is its closest relative. The specific epithet aridus is given in reference to the dry habitat of this species.
