= Pandanus obeliscus =

Scientific classification
- Kingdom: Plantae
- Clade: Tracheophytes
- Clade: Angiosperms
- Clade: Monocots
- Order: Pandanales
- Family: Pandanaceae
- Genus: Pandanus
- Species: P. obeliscus

Binomial name
- Pandanus obeliscus Thouars

Species of flowering plant

Pandanus obeliscus is a pandan or screwpine endemic to Madagascar, Its common name is vacoua en pyramide. It is up to 18 m (59 ft) height and up to 0.9 m (2 ft 11 in) diameter at breast height. By reason of this very thick primary growth it may be the most massive (heaviest) of all pandans. Pandanus obeliscus belongs to a section (Acanthostyla) of the genus which are collectively called the "coniferoids" which have large linear leaves on the main axis (trunk) which are called "crown megaphylls" and can be up to 3.7 m (12 ft) long by 15 cm (5.9 in) width. As these age, they fall away and are replaced by hundreds of side shoots with very much smaller leaves 15 cm (5.9 in) long by only about 1 cm (0.39 in) width. which are responsible for giving the tree its conifer-like appearance. The species was first described in 1808. These side branches frequently divide pseudodichotomously. Some taxonomists regard P. obeliscus and P. pulcher to be conspecific.
