= Pandanus parvicentralis =

Conservation status
- Data Deficient (IUCN 2.3)

Scientific classification
- Kingdom: Plantae
- Clade: Tracheophytes
- Clade: Angiosperms
- Clade: Monocots
- Order: Pandanales
- Family: Pandanaceae
- Genus: Pandanus
- Species: P. parvicentralis

Binomial name
- Pandanus parvicentralis Huynh

Species of flowering plant

Pandanus parvicentralis is a species of plant in the family Pandanaceae. It is endemic to Gabon.
