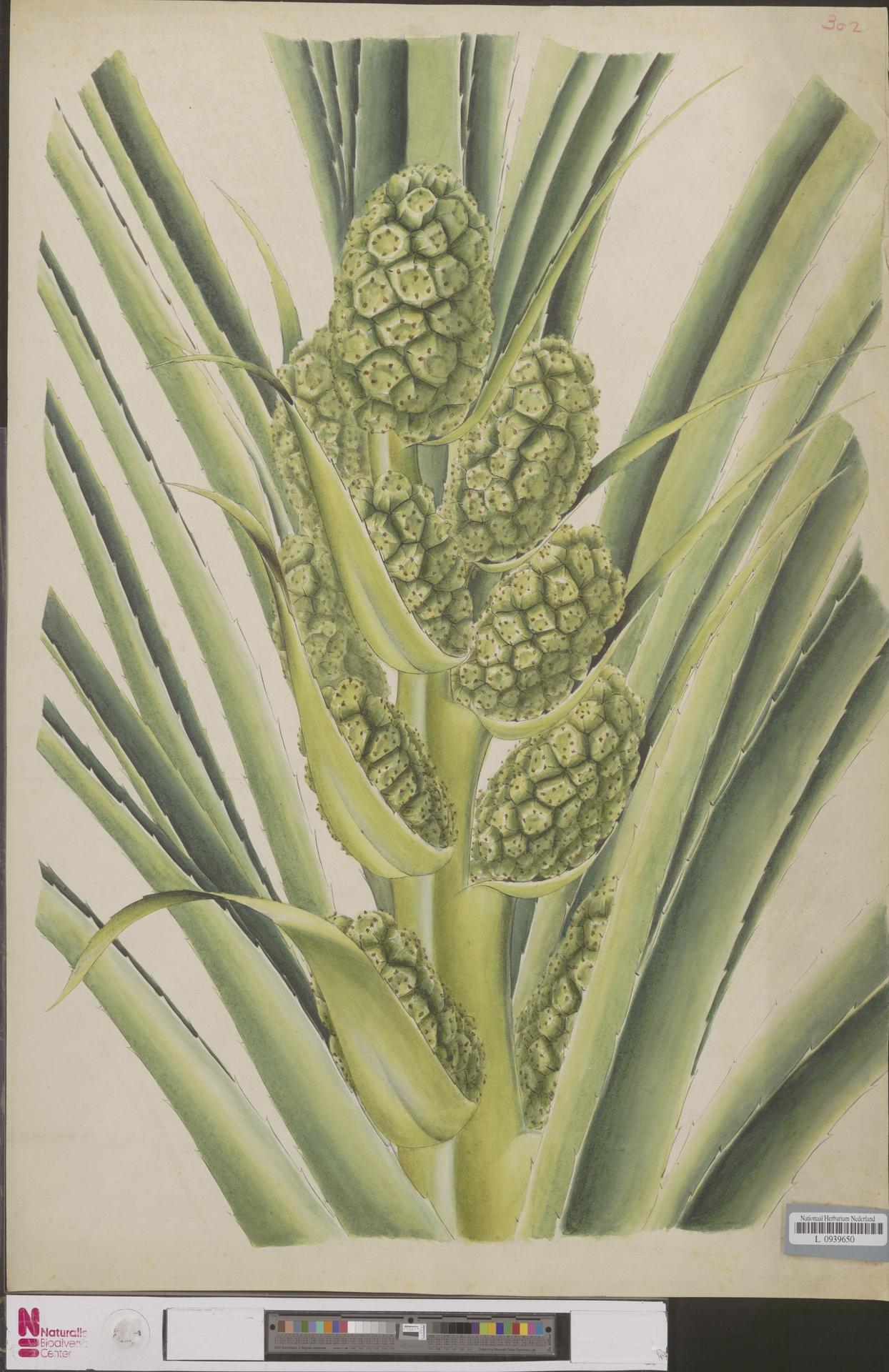
- Botanical illustration of the multiple fruit-heads of Pandanus conglomeratus

Conservation status
- Extinct (IUCN 2.3)

Scientific classification
- Kingdom: Plantae
- Clade: Tracheophytes
- Clade: Angiosperms
- Clade: Monocots
- Order: Pandanales
- Family: Pandanaceae
- Genus: Pandanus
- Species: †P. conglomeratus

Binomial name
- †Pandanus conglomeratus Balf.f.

Synonyms
- Pandanus reflexus (de Vriese) K.Koch

= Pandanus conglomeratus =

Species of plant

Pandanus conglomeratus is a species of plant in the family Pandanaceae, endemic to Mauritius, but possibly extinct.

== Description ==
A short (4-5m), sparsely-branched tree. The sharp, pale green leaves are armed with large, white, erect spines.

This species can be distinguished by its oblong fruit-heads, several of which appear together on a pendulous peduncle. It is the only species of Mauritius to have more than one fruit-head on the same stalk.

== Distribution ==
It was endemic to Mauritius, where it was formerly common in the damper parts of the highlands. It was recently recorded from near Midlands (Riviere Eau Bleue), Fressanges and Beau-Bassin. However it now appears to be extinct.
