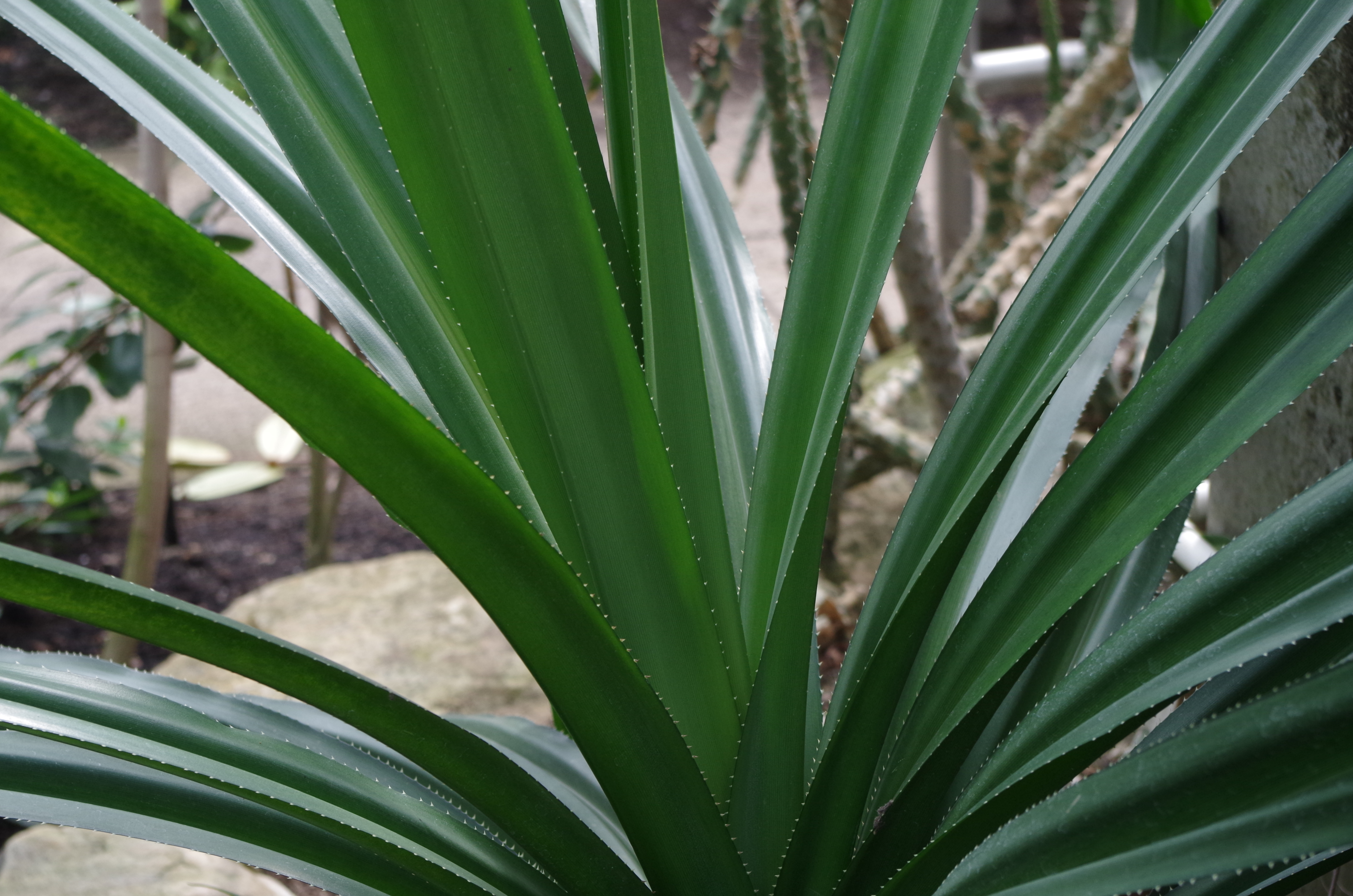

Scientific classification
- Kingdom: Plantae
- Clade: Tracheophytes
- Clade: Angiosperms
- Clade: Monocots
- Order: Pandanales
- Family: Pandanaceae
- Genus: Pandanus
- Species: P. spathulatus

Binomial name
- Pandanus spathulatus Martelli

= Pandanus spathulatus =

Species of flowering plant

Pandanus spathulatus is a species of plant in the family Pandanaceae, endemic to Mauritius but possibly extinct in the wild.

== Description ==
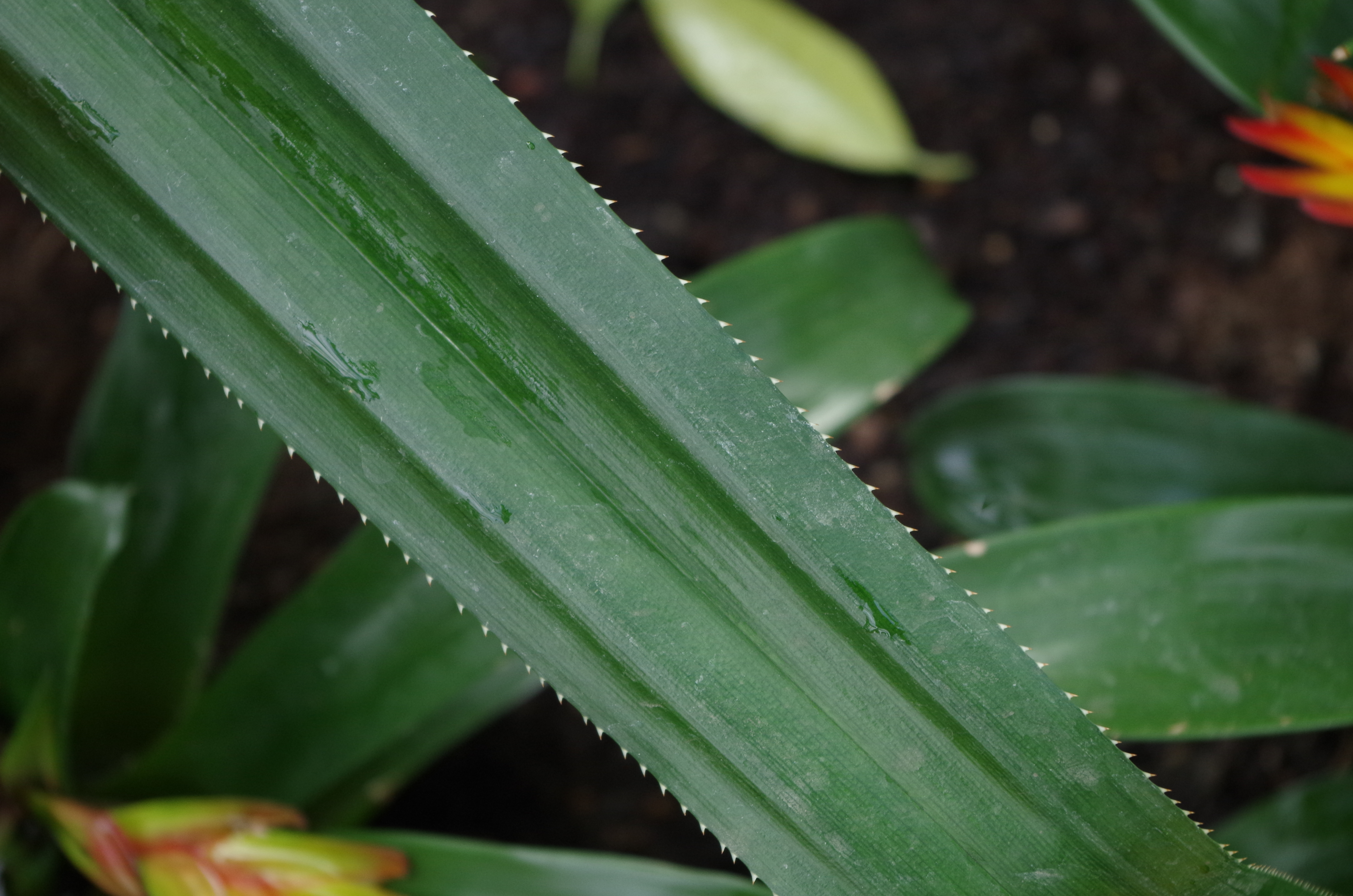
Leaf detail

This species is distinguished by its fruit-heads, each of which is packed with 2-3-locular drupes that are 6–7 cm x 4–5 cm in size. The exposed portions of the drupes are pyramid-shaped and have flat stigmas at their tips.

== Habitat ==
It is endemic to Mauritius, where it was once widespread. Its habitat is now largely destroyed.
