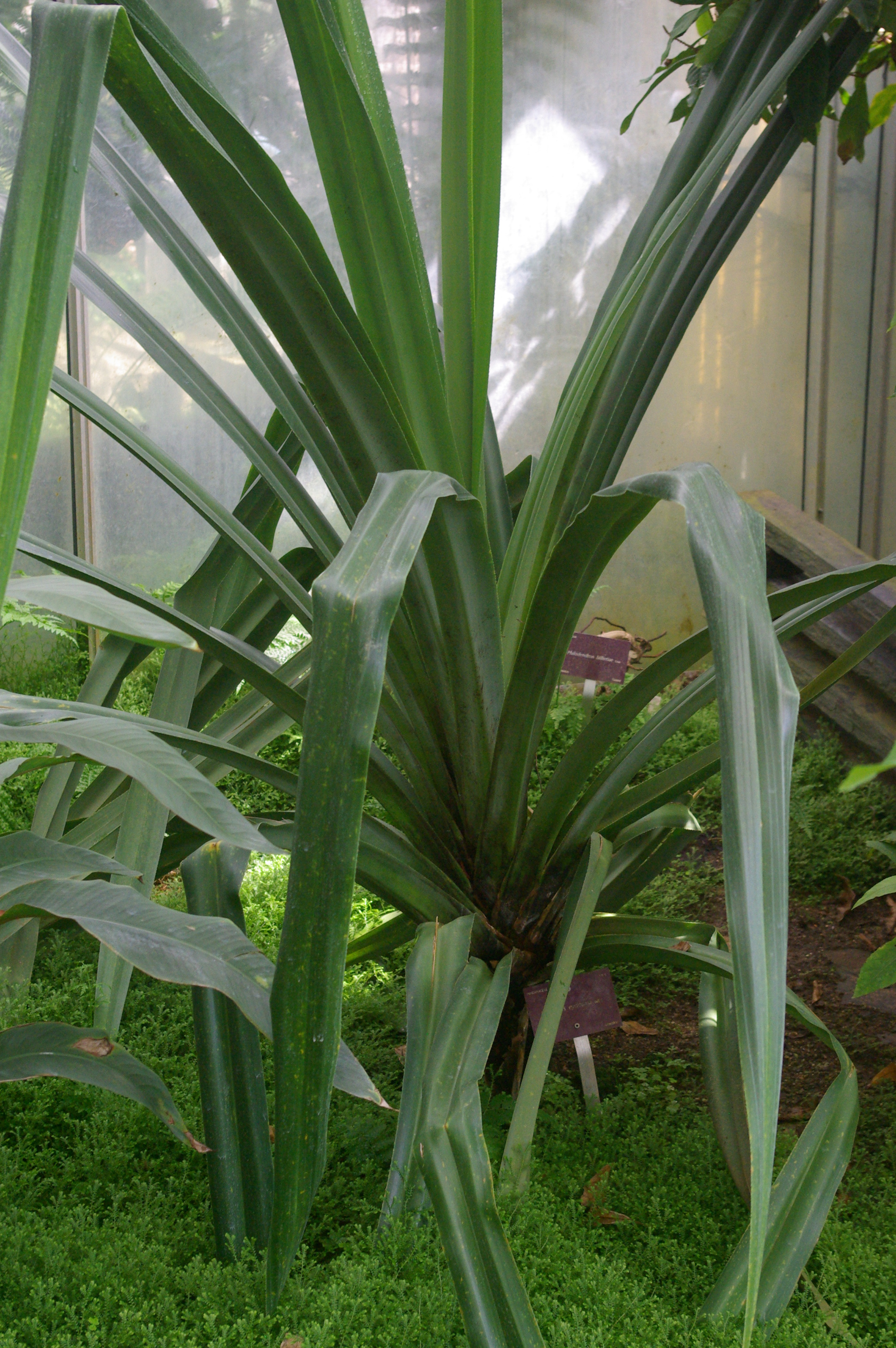
- Pandanus eydouxia, Conservatoire botanique national de Brest

Scientific classification
- Kingdom: Plantae
- Clade: Tracheophytes
- Clade: Angiosperms
- Clade: Monocots
- Order: Pandanales
- Family: Pandanaceae
- Genus: Pandanus
- Species: P. eydouxia

Binomial name
- Pandanus eydouxia Balf.f.

Synonyms
- Eydouxia macrocarpa Gaudich.

= Pandanus eydouxia =

Species of plant

Pandanus eydouxia is a species of plant in the family Pandanaceae, endemic to Mauritius.

== Description ==
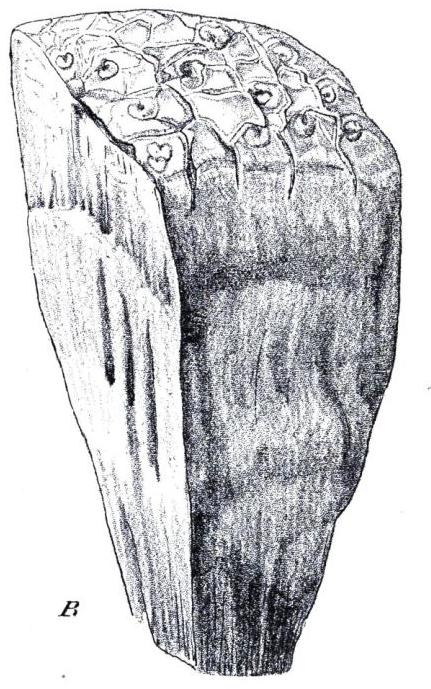
1900 illustration of part of a drupe from a Pandanus eydouxia fruit-head.

A tall (10-12m) branching tree that forms a wide, domed canopy. The 20–25 cm wide trunk is grey and cracked, while younger stems bear brown leaf-scars. The stems are lined with many small, sharp knobs.

The leaves are long, drooping and glaucous-green to yellow-green with more brownish bases. Leaf margins are lined with tiny, mild, white spines that can age to a yellow or brown. The leaf midrib also has spines, but not near the base.

This species is most easily distinguished by its very large (20–25 cm), rounded fruit-head, that is held up erect on a short peduncle that is densely covered in protective bracts. Each fruit-head holds 15-25 drupes, that are flat-topped and covered in stigmas, but otherwise variable in shape. The half or third of the drupe, that is inside the fruit-head, becomes orange or red when ripe. Each drupe holds a large number (over 50) of carpels.

== Habitat ==
It is endemic to Mauritius, and is likely the most common endemic species still occurring on that island, especially in the wetter highlands. Large clumps can still be found by rivers and in thickets.
