= Pandanus laxespicatus =

Scientific classification
- Kingdom: Plantae
- Clade: Tracheophytes
- Clade: Angiosperms
- Clade: Monocots
- Order: Pandanales
- Family: Pandanaceae
- Genus: Pandanus
- Species: P. laxespicatus

Binomial name
- Pandanus laxespicatus Martelli

Species of flowering plant

Pandanus laxespicatus is a screwpine or pandan of the wetlands of Madagascar, and belonging to the monocot family Pandanaceae. It was of fairly recent discovery, having been unknown to science prior to 1951 when described by Martelli and Pichi-Sermolli. For the next seventeen years, it was just another member of a large family, but in 1968 Dr. Benjamin C. Stone discovered that at a certain stage of its growth (when the trunk is 10 to 13 feet (3 to 4 meters) in height) it produces the longest linear (ribbon-like) leaves of any known plant; up to 33 feet (10 metres) in length and 14 inches (36 centimetres) in width. P. laxispicatus belongs to the same section (Acanthophylla) as P. pulcher. P. odorissimus and P obeliscus, which are known collectively as the Coniferoids, because their numerous side branches cause them to resemble huge Christmas trees. The very large leaves are known as "crown megaphylls" and sometimes have the appearance of a green "star" at the top of the tree. As the megaphylls fall away with age, they are replaced by side shoots of much smaller leaves (usually less than a foot (30 cm) long by an inch (2.5 cm) in width) which account for the conifer-like appearance of the mature trees.
