= Pandanus pyramidalis =

Conservation status
- Critically Endangered (IUCN 2.3)

Scientific classification
- Kingdom: Plantae
- Clade: Tracheophytes
- Clade: Angiosperms
- Clade: Monocots
- Order: Pandanales
- Family: Pandanaceae
- Genus: Pandanus
- Species: P. pyramidalis

Binomial name
- Pandanus pyramidalis Balf.f.

Synonyms
- Pandanus striatus Carmich. ex Balf.f.

Species of plant

Pandanus pyramidalis is a species of plant in the family Pandanaceae, endemic to Mauritius.

== Description ==
A tall species, reaching up to 15 meters in height. Its horizontal branches end in rosettes of tapering leaves.

This species can be distinguished by the white or brown spines on its leaves, and by its fruit-heads which hang on strongly recurved stalks. Each fruit-head has 100-150 5.6 cm drupes, which each protrude in a glossy green "pyramid". However, the exposed tip of each drupe is flattened (the areole) and - unlike Pandanus heterocarpus - without any corky margins. The basal joined portions of the drupes become light yellow when the fruit is ripe.

== Habitat ==
It is endemic to Mauritius. Its natural habitat is river banks in the central highlands. It is threatened by habitat loss. The last known wild specimen was destroyed in 1996 and it is possibly extinct.
