= Harold St. John =

American botanist (1892-1991)

Harold St. John (July 24/25 1892 – December 12, 1991) was a professor of botany at the University of Hawaiʻi at Mānoa from 1929 to 1958. A prolific specialist in field botany and systematics, he is credited with naming about 500 new species of Pandanus, along with many other species, especially in the Pacific Islands.

== Life ==
Born in Pittsburgh, Pennsylvania, he was educated at Harvard University, where he earned a Doctor of Philosophy in 1917. After service in Europe during World War I, he taught botany at the State College of Washington (now Washington State University) (1920–1929), where he also became the curator of its herbarium. In 1929, he joined the faculty of the University of Hawaiʻi, where he served as longtime chair of the botany department (1929–1940, 1943–1954), then as director of the university's Lyon Arboretum. The St. John Plant Science Laboratory building on the Mānoa campus, which houses the botany department, is named after him.

Not long after his arrival in Hawaii, he joined the Bernice P. Bishop Museum's Mangarevan Expedition of 1934, which returned with perhaps the richest collection of Polynesian plants ever made. During World War II he took a leave of absence to lead a scientific team to the rainforests of Colombia in search of Cinchona trees in order to provide additional sources of the malaria drug quinine, which was in short supply. His team reported a harvest of 60,000 tons of bark. After the war he investigated the effects of radiation on vegetation in the Marshall Islands for the United States Atomic Energy Commission.

He continued traveling and publishing long into retirement. He held professorships at Chatham College in his native Pittsburgh (1958–1959), at the Université de Saigon and Université de Hue in Vietnam (1959–1961), and at Cairo University (1963). He was also a Fellow of the American Association for the Advancement of Science and of the Linnean Society of London.

== Selected works ==
- 1915. Elymus arenarius and its American representatives. Rhodora 17: pages 98–103.
- 1916. A revision of the North American species of Potamogeton of the section Coleophylli. Rhodora 18: pages 121–138.
- 1922. A botanical exploration of the north shore of the Gulf of St. Lawrence including an annotated list of the species of vascular plants. Mem. Victoria Memorial Mus., Can. Deptartment of Mines 126(Biol. Ser. 4): pages i-iii, 1-30, 6 pl., 2 maps.
- 1928. A revision of the loco-weeds of Washington. Proc. Biol. Soc. Wash. 41: pages 97–106.
- 1931. Additions to the flora of Niihau. B. P. Bishop Mus. Occ. Pap. 9(14): pages 1–11, 3 pl.
- 1933. The sausage tree. Paradise Pac. 46: pages 5–6, 3 pl.
- 1935. Hawaiian Panicum, Metrosideros, Sanicula, Lobelia and Rollandia. B. P. Bishop Mus., Occ. Pap. 11(13): pages 1–18, 6 figs., 3 pl.
- 1937. Flora of southeastern Washington and of adjacent Idaho. Students' Book Corporation. Pullman, Washington. 531 pp.
- 1941. Revision of the genus Swertia (Gentianaceae) of the Americas and the reduction of Frasera. Amer. Midl. Nat. 26: 1-29.
- 1946. Endemism in the Hawaiian flora, and a revision of the Hawaiian species of Gunnera (Haloragidaceae). Hawaiian Plant Stud. 11. California. Acad. Sci., Proc. IV 25: 377–420, pl. 37–46.
- 1948. Report on the flora of Pingelap Atoll, Caroline Islands, Micronesia, and observations on the vocabulary of the native inhabitants. Pac. Plant Stud. 7. Pac. Sci. 2(2): pages 96–113, 9 figs.
- 1951. Plant records from Aur Atoll and Majuro Atoll, Marshall Islands, Micronesia. Pac. Plant Stud. 9. Pac. Sci. 5(3): 279–286, fig. 1.
- 1952. Monograph of the genus Isodendrion (Violaceae). Hawaiian Plant Stud. 21. Pac. Sci. 6(3): pages 213–255, figs. 1–15.
- 1954. Ferns of Rotuma Island, a descriptive manual. B. P. Bishop Mus., ace. Pap. 21(9): pages 161–208, figs. 1–11.
- 1955. Biography of Wilhelm Nikolaus Suksdorf (1850–1932), pioneer botanist of the state of Washington. Res. Stud., State College Wash. 23(4): pages 225–278, 13 pl.
- 1958. Nomenclature of plants. A text for the application by the case method of the International Code of Botanical Nomenclature. Ronald Press, New York. i-vii, 157 pages.
- 1959. Botanical novelties on the Island of Niihau, Hawaiian Islands. Hawaiian Plant Stud. 25. Pac. Sci. 13(2): pages 156–190, 11 figs.
- 1962. Monograph of the genus Elodea (Hydrocharitaceae). Part 1. The species found in the Great Plains, the Rocky Mountains, and the Pacific states and provinces of North America. Res. Stud., Washington State University 30(2): pages 19–44, 5 figs.
- 1963. Monograph of the genus Elodea (Hydrocharitaceae). Part 3. The species found in northern and eastern South America. Darwiniana 12(4): pages 639–652, figs. 1–3, tab. 1.
- 1964. Instructions for collecting Pandanus. Flora Malesiana Bull. 19: pages 1133–1134.
- 1969. Monograph of the genus Brighamia (Lobeliaceae). Hawaiian Plant Stud. 29. Linn. Soc., London, Bot. J. 61: pages 187–204, 18 pages, 7 figs., 2 pl.
- 1970. The career of Harold L. Lyon, founder of the Lyon Arboretum. University of Hawaiʻi, Harold L. Lyon Arboretum Lecture No. I: pages ii-iv, portrait.
- 1971. The vascular plants of the Horne and Wallis Islands. Pac. Sci. 25(3): pages 313–348, figs. 1–2.
- 1973. List and summary of the flowering plants in the Hawaiian Islands. Pac. Trop. Bot. Gard., Mem. 1: 1–519.
- 1974. The vascular flora of Fanning Island, Line Islands, Pacific Ocean. Pac. Sci. 28(3): pages 339–355, figs. 1–7.
- 1977. Revision of the genus Pandanus Stickman. Part 40. The Fijian species of the section Pandanus. Pac. Sci. 30(3): pages 249–315, figs. 364–394.
- 1980 Two new species of Pandanus (Pandanaceae) from Rennell Island. Noona Dan Papers no. 137. Nat. Hist. Rennell Is., British Solomon Islands 8: pages 7–13, figs. 1–3.

== See also ==
- Guide to the Harold St. John Papers 1912-1957
