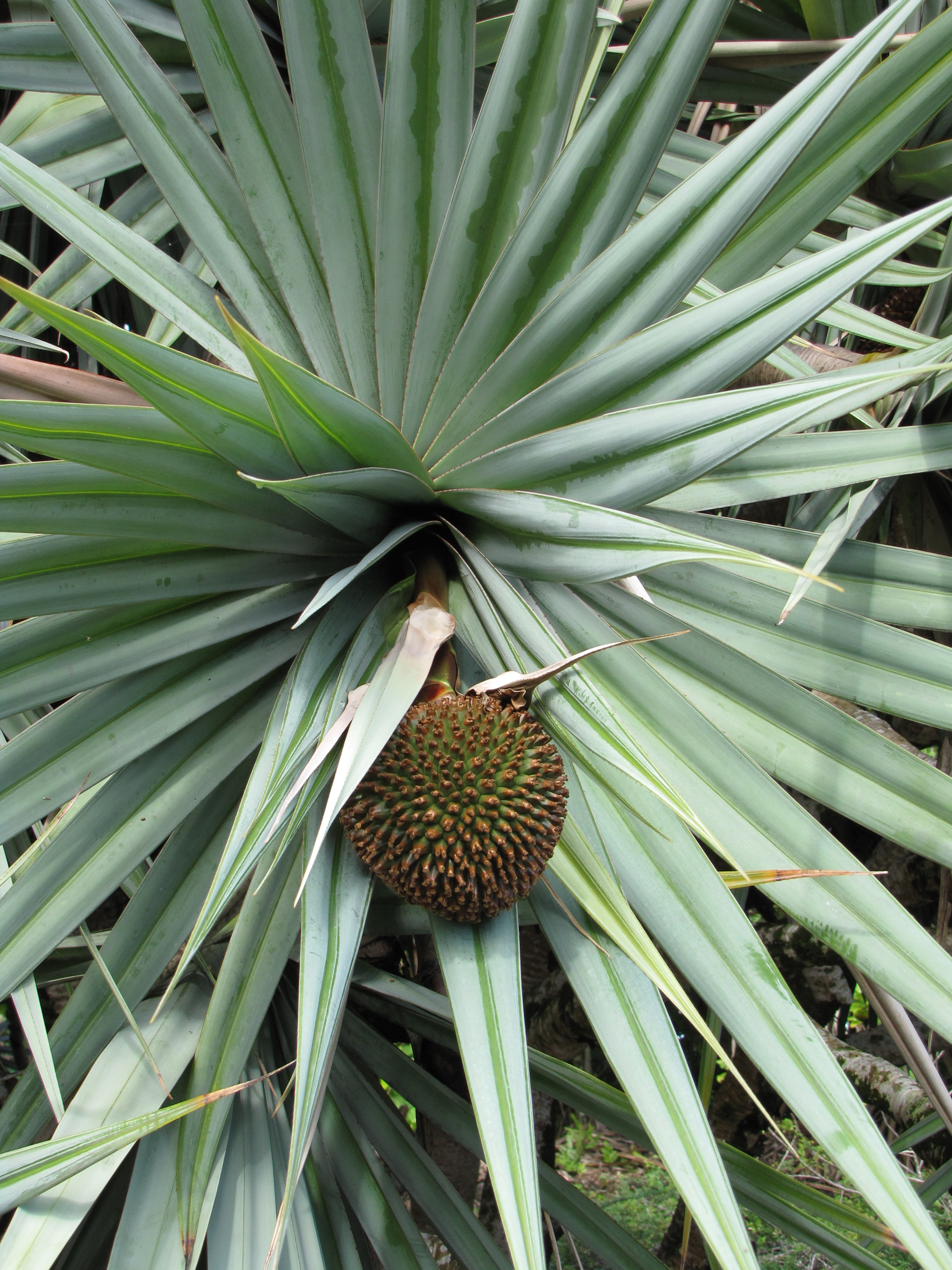
- Rosette and fruit-head of Pandanus vandermeeschii

Scientific classification
- Kingdom: Plantae
- Clade: Tracheophytes
- Clade: Angiosperms
- Clade: Monocots
- Order: Pandanales
- Family: Pandanaceae
- Genus: Pandanus
- Species: P. vandermeeschii

Binomial name
- Pandanus vandermeeschii Balf.f.

Synonyms
- Foullioya maritima Gaudich.

= Pandanus vandermeeschii =

Species of plant

Pandanus vandermeeschii is a species of plant in the family Pandanaceae. It is endemic to the coastal areas of Mauritius.

== Description ==
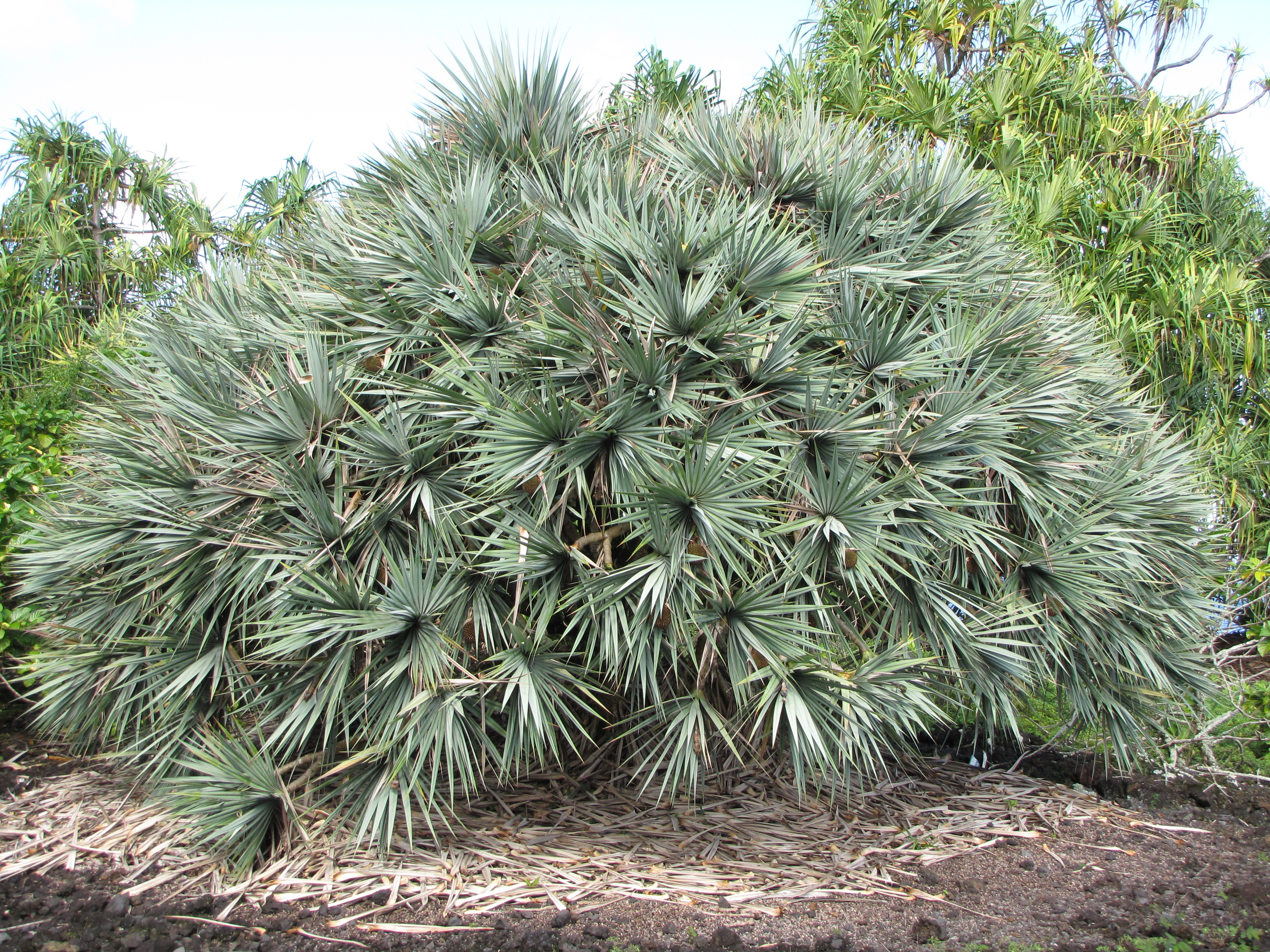
Adult specimen in cultivation.

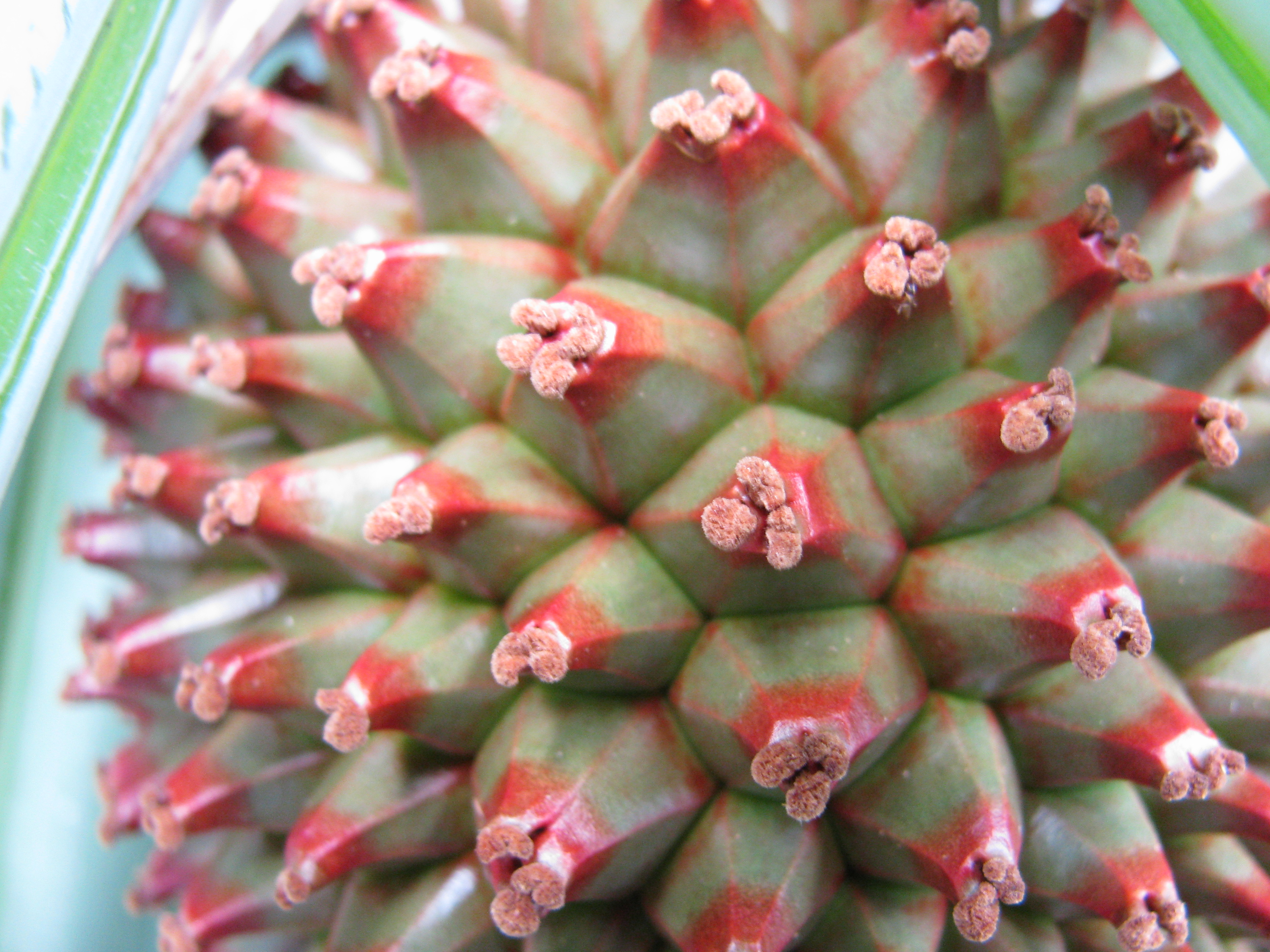
Detail of the fruit-head

A small freely-branching tree of 6–8 metres (20–26 ft), the ends of its branches can droop downwards. Its leaves are grey-green, and its bark is grey-pink. It can also be distinguished from the several other species of Mauritian Pandanus by its 15-centimetre (5.9 in) hanging fruit-heads that each have 250–450 protruding drupes (the upper half of each drupe is free) which contain the pointed seeds. The tip of each drupe is divided by deep clefts.

== Habitat ==
This species was once common around the coastal lowlands and offshore islets of Mauritius. Its natural habitat is the palm rich forests, where it grows together with Pandanus utilis (a species which can be distinguished by its whorled darker green leaves). It is threatened by habitat loss but can still be found on Round Island, Flat Island and offshore islets near Mahebourg.

Its Mauritian relatives are mostly native to the highland marshes and heaths, and include Pandanus barklyi (a shrub with large flat seeds and drooping leaves); Pandanus eydouxia (a tree with long wide leaves and enormous fruits); Pandanus rigidifolius & wiehei (small-seeded shrubs with stiff and vertical leaves).
