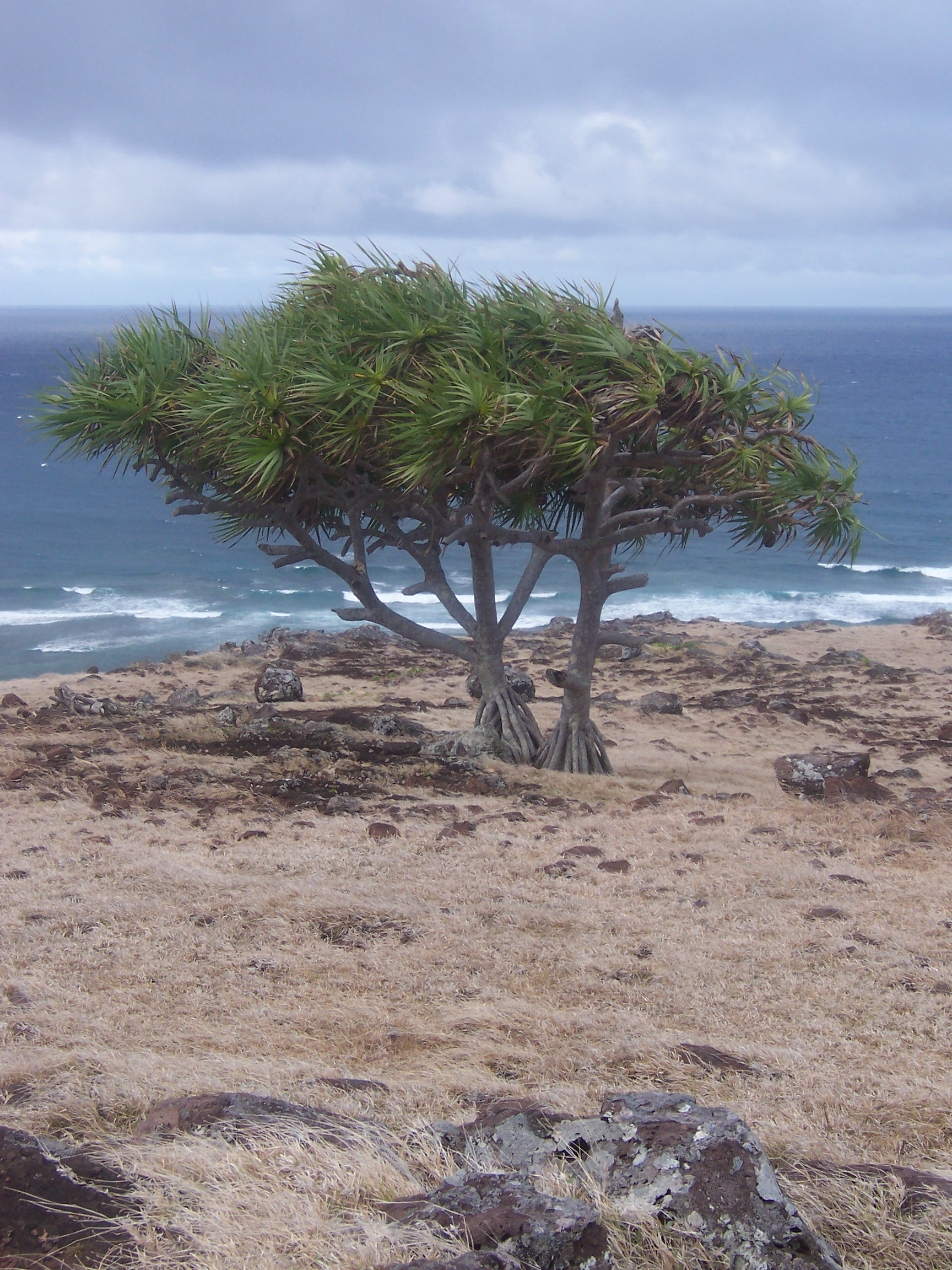
- Adult Pandanus heterocarpus growing on Rodrigues island.

Scientific classification
- Kingdom: Plantae
- Clade: Tracheophytes
- Clade: Angiosperms
- Clade: Monocots
- Order: Pandanales
- Family: Pandanaceae
- Genus: Pandanus
- Species: P. heterocarpus

Binomial name
- Pandanus heterocarpus Balf.f.

Synonyms
- Pandanus ornatus W.Bull

= Pandanus heterocarpus =

Species of plant

Pandanus heterocarpus is a species of plant in the family Pandanaceae. It is commonly called the "Rodrigues screwpine", known locally as "vacoa parasol" or "vacoa cale rouge". It is endemic to the island of Rodrigues.

== Description ==
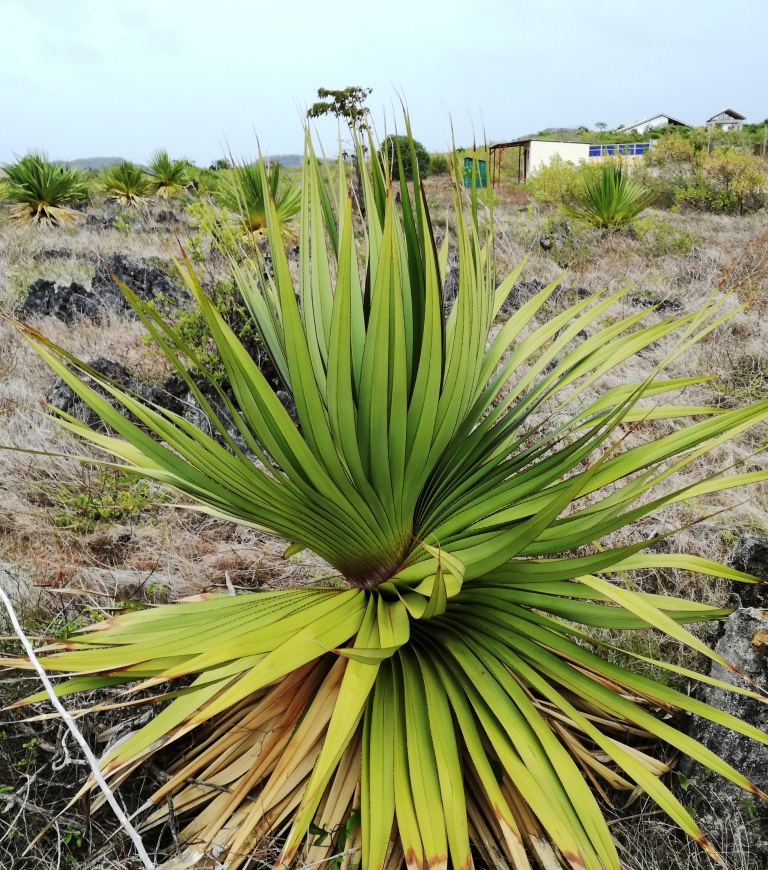
Juvenile plant growing at Anse Quitor Nature Reserve showing its clear, vigorous spiral

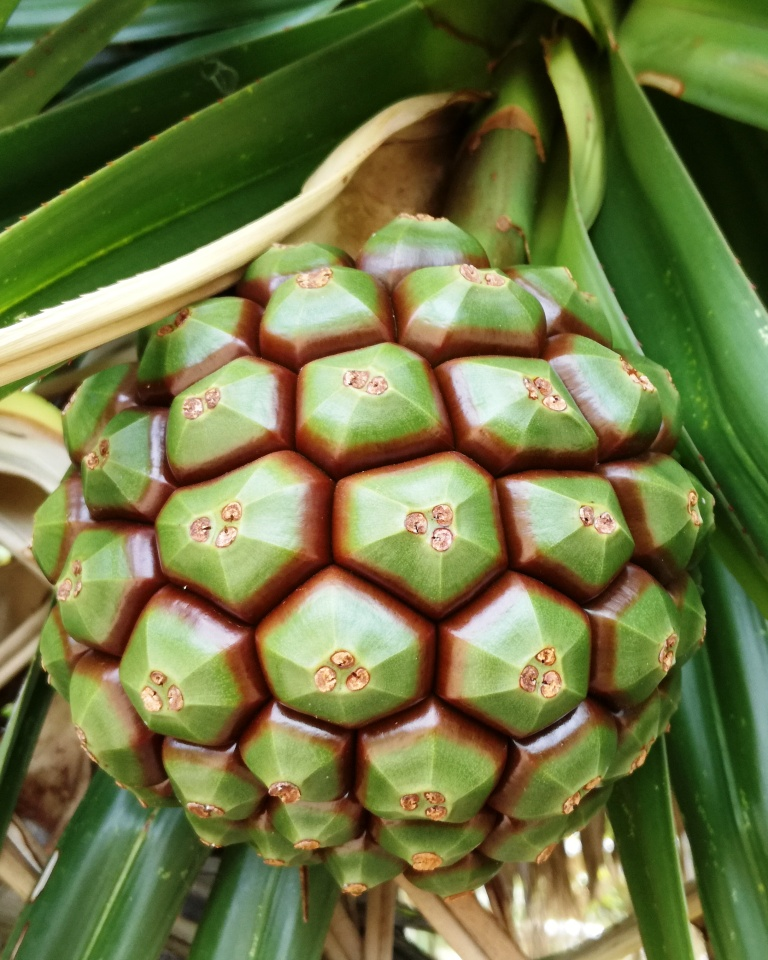
Fruit of the Rodrigues Screwpine, showing smooth, green pyramid-shaped drupes with purple margins

The Rodrigues screwpine grows to 7 meters in height, and branches from its thick trunk to form a wide umbrella shape. The many branches are thick and begin to grow from low on the trunk. The rosettes form with clear spirals. The leaves are up to a meter in length and have orange-red spines on their margins and keel. Young plants have large, long rosettes, with longer leaves. Older plants have smaller, shorter rosettes and shorter leaves. The fruit heads are very variable, but are typically rounded and up to 18 cm. Each fruit head has 70 to 95 drupes. The exposed tip of each drupe is a curved pyramid shape, with a green colour, but with purple colour around the base.

== Habitat ==
This species is endemic to the island of Rodrigues. It occurs throughout the island and is one of the only species of that island that is still common. It is especially common on the lowlands and also near the coast. On the higher mountains it shares its habitat with another endemic, the slender Pandanus tenuifolius. Inhabitants of the island use the leaves of both species for the fibres, and for making roofs, hats or baskets.

The introduced exotic species Pandanus utilis, from Madagascar, is also found growing in Rodrigues, and can be confused with this species.
