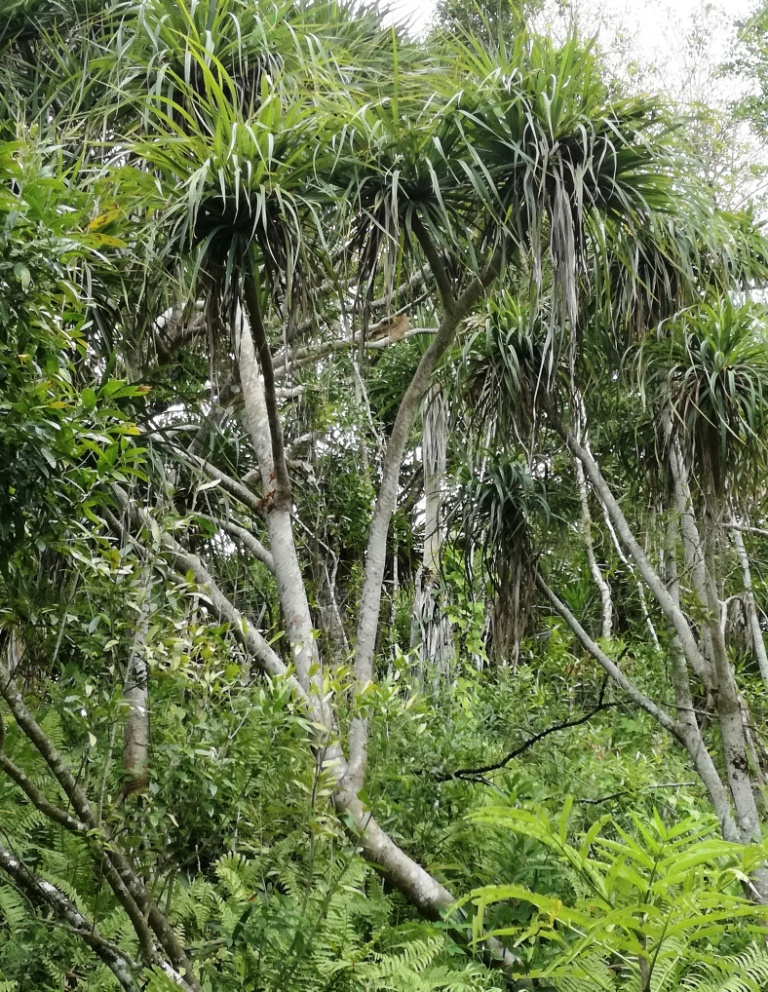
- Pandanus tenuifolius growing in Grande Montagne Nature Reserve, on Rodrigues island.

Scientific classification
- Kingdom: Plantae
- Clade: Tracheophytes
- Clade: Angiosperms
- Clade: Monocots
- Order: Pandanales
- Family: Pandanaceae
- Genus: Pandanus
- Species: P. tenuifolius

Binomial name
- Pandanus tenuifolius Balf.f.

Synonyms
- Pandanus lindenii Warb. Pandanus pynaertii Warb.

= Pandanus tenuifolius =

Species of plant

Pandanus tenuifolius ("Vacoa chevron") is a species of plant in the family Pandanaceae. It is endemic to the island of Rodrigues.

== Description ==
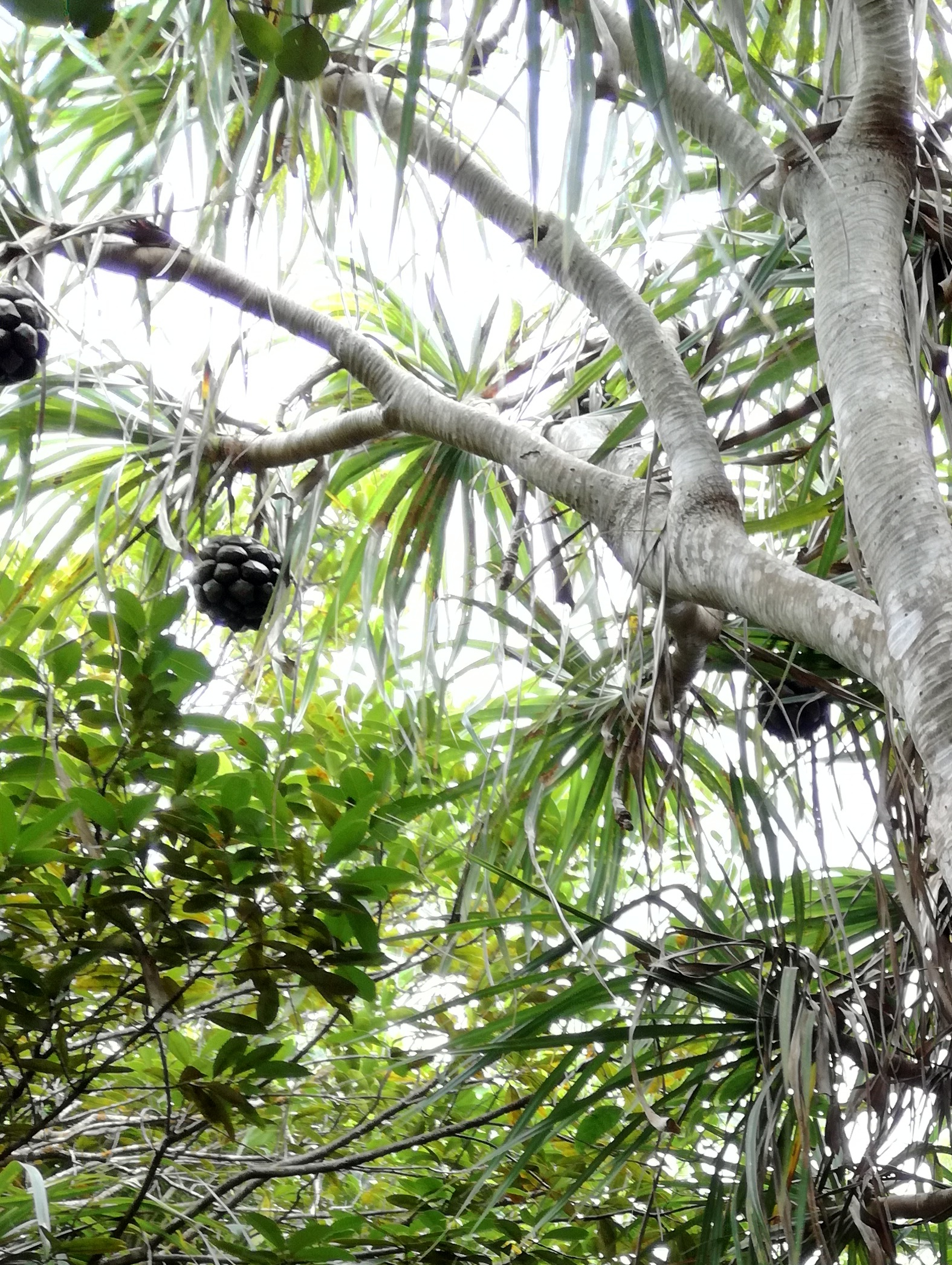
Fruit heads

This small species grows to 5 meters in height, and grows relatively few branches, at an acute angle from its smooth trunk.

The fruit heads are small (diameter 7–12 cm), rounded and each bears only 15-45 drupes. The exposed tip of each drupe is a smooth, rounded shape, and it ripens to a uniform, dark red colour.

== Habitat ==
This species is endemic to the island of Rodrigues. It is found mainly in small groups on the higher mountains and valley slopes of the island, where it shares its habitat with the other endemic Pandanus species, the more robust Pandanus heterocarpus. Inhabitants of the island use the leaves of both species for the fibres, and for making roofs, hats or baskets.

The introduced exotic species Pandanus utilis, from Madagascar, is also found growing in Rodrigues, and can be confused with this species.
