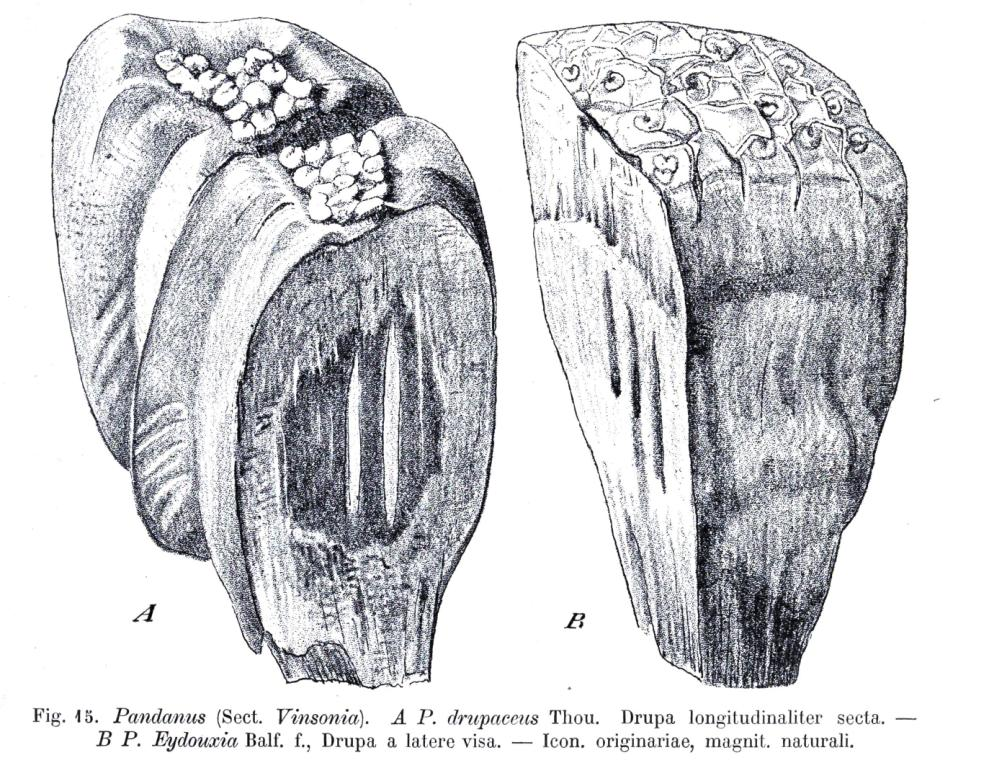
- Botanical illustration of the drupe of Pandanus drupaceus (left)

Scientific classification
- Kingdom: Plantae
- Clade: Tracheophytes
- Clade: Angiosperms
- Clade: Monocots
- Order: Pandanales
- Family: Pandanaceae
- Genus: Pandanus
- Species: P. drupaceus

Binomial name
- Pandanus drupaceus Thouars

Synonyms
- Pandanus strigilis Carmich. ex Balf.f. Pandanus strigilis Carmich. ex Balf.f. Vinsonia drupacea (Thouars) Gaudich.

= Pandanus drupaceus =

Species of flowering plant

Pandanus drupaceus is a species of plant in the family Pandanaceae, endemic to Mauritius.

== Description ==
A low-lying, spreading, freely-branching tree. Decumbent branches can lie along the ground and root to form new trees. There are only a few stilt-roots at the base of the trunk, and the pale grey bark is cracked and fissured.

It can easily be distinguished from related species by its rosettes of wide, flat, stiff, incurved leaves. These have reddish-orange marginal spines only near the tip of the leaf, and not near the leaf base. (Pandanus rigidifolius is the only other local species of Pandanus to have rigid, incurved leaves but it is a smaller decumbent species and its leaves are smaller and replicate.)

The large (20–25 cm; 7.9–9.8 in) fruit-head is held erect on a short peduncle. Each fruit-head is packed with 20-30 purple, flattened, angular drupes.

== Distribution ==
It was endemic to Mauritius, where it was formerly common in the highlands. It still occurs in wet areas and marshes near Midlands and Plaine Champagne, but also dryer rocky outcrops.
