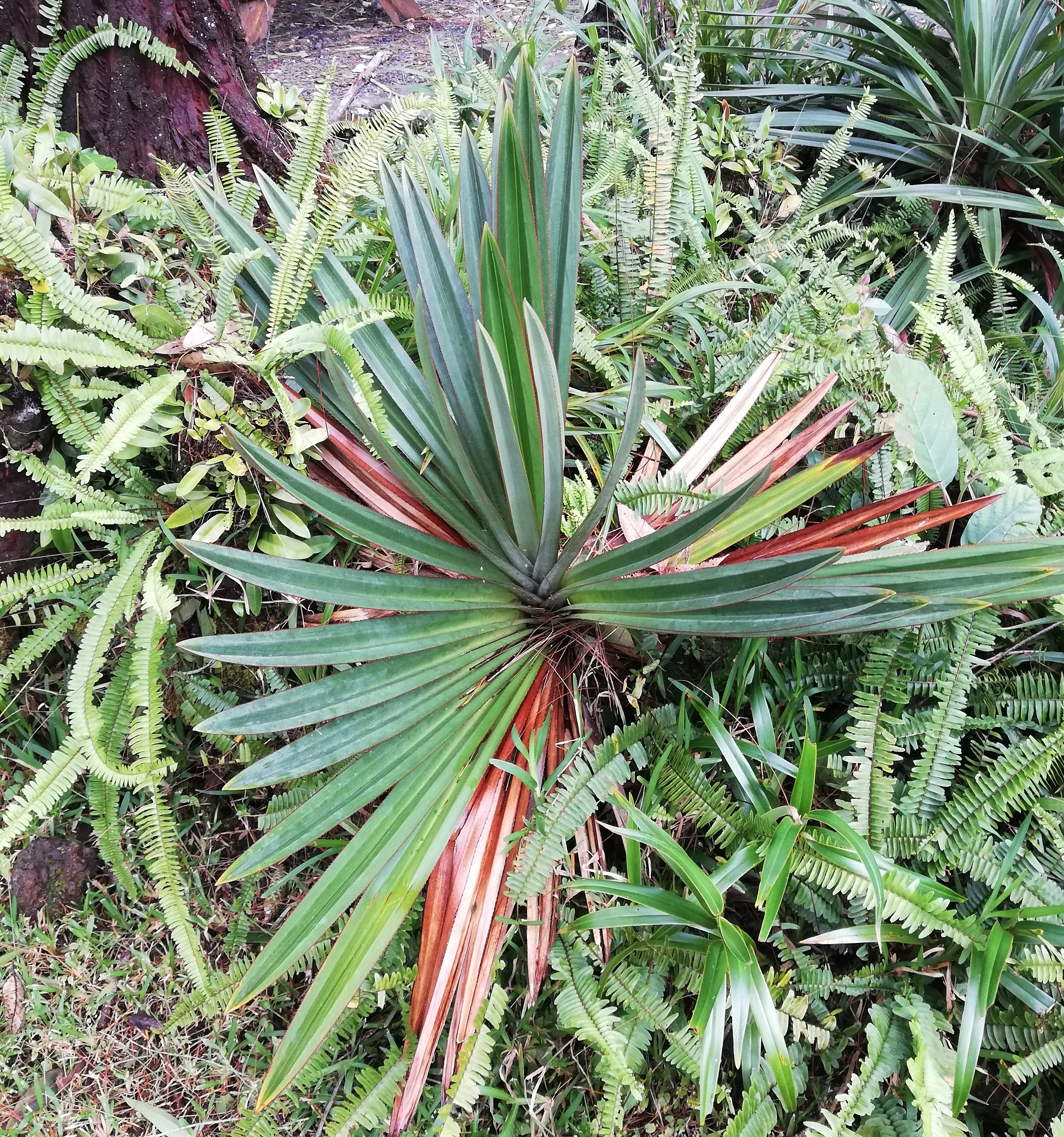
- The small, rigid, incurved leaves of Pandanus rigidifolius

Scientific classification
- Kingdom: Plantae
- Clade: Tracheophytes
- Clade: Angiosperms
- Clade: Monocots
- Order: Pandanales
- Family: Pandanaceae
- Genus: Pandanus
- Species: P. rigidifolius

Binomial name
- Pandanus rigidifolius R.E.Vaughan & Wiehe

= Pandanus rigidifolius =

Species of flowering plant

Pandanus rigidifolius is a species of plant in the family Pandanaceae, endemic to Mauritius.

== Description ==
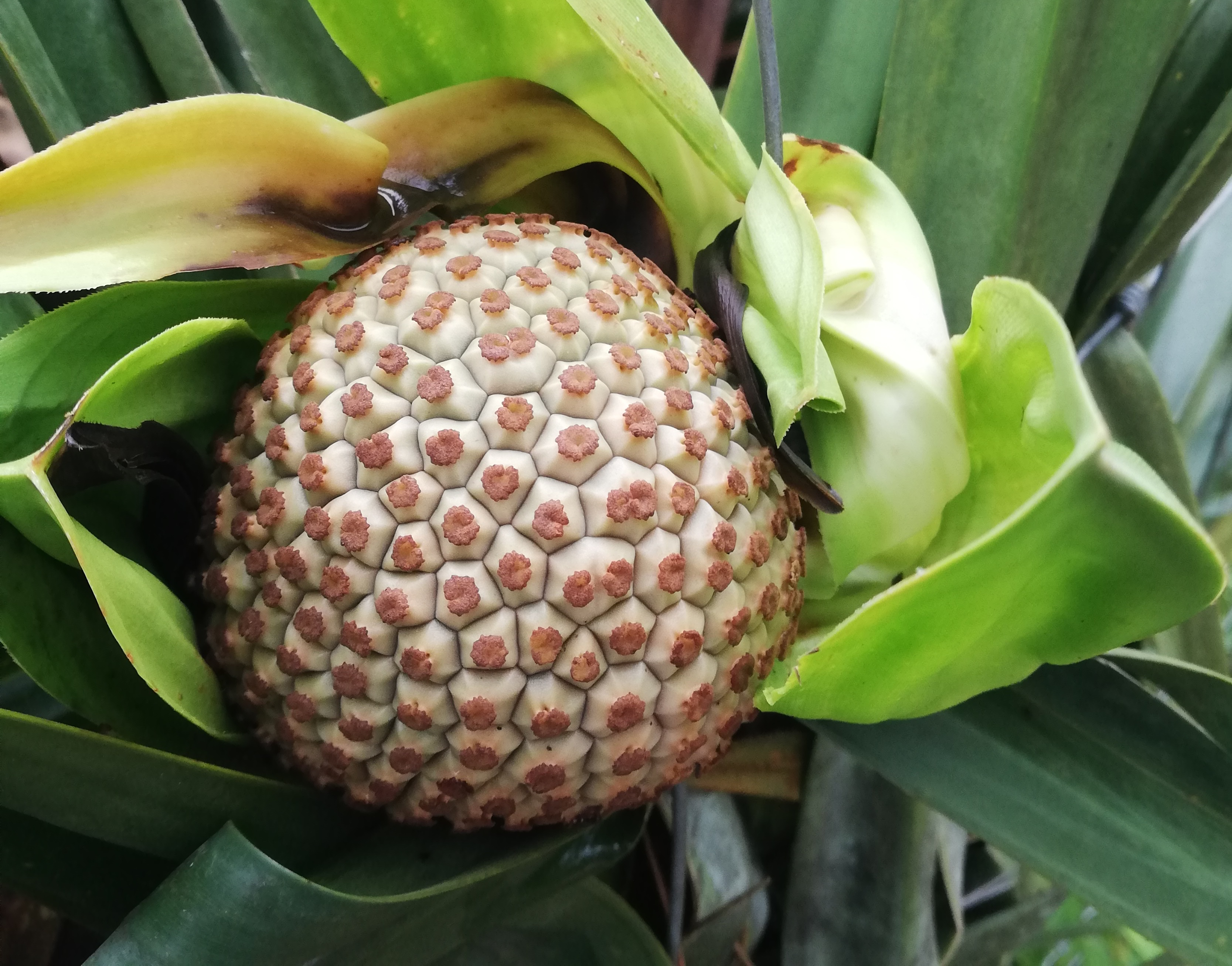
The small Pandanus rigidifolius fruit body is held upright, on a short peduncle.

A low, small, spreading, many-branched tree. It produces many stilt-like roots, along the trunk, but also along the length of the side branches.

It can be distinguished by its compact (often trifarious) rosettes of small, rigid, erect, red-spined, deep blue-green leaves. These are usually only 75 cm long and 6 cm wide, folded lengthwise (reduplicate), stiff, erect, and have an abrupt, obtuse leaf tip. The reddish spines are closely set along the margins of the leaves.

The small (7–8 cm) fruit head is held erect on a short peduncle, and it is enclosed in three-ranked (trifarious) bracts. Each fruit head is packed with 200–220 small, unilocular drupes, with slightly convex tips.

In its appearance, it is most similar to the other dwarf Mauritian species Pandanus microcarpus as well as the Madagascan species Pandanus microcephalus. Another Mauritian species, Pandanus drupaceus, though a larger shrub or tree, also has rigid, incurved leaves.

== Distribution ==
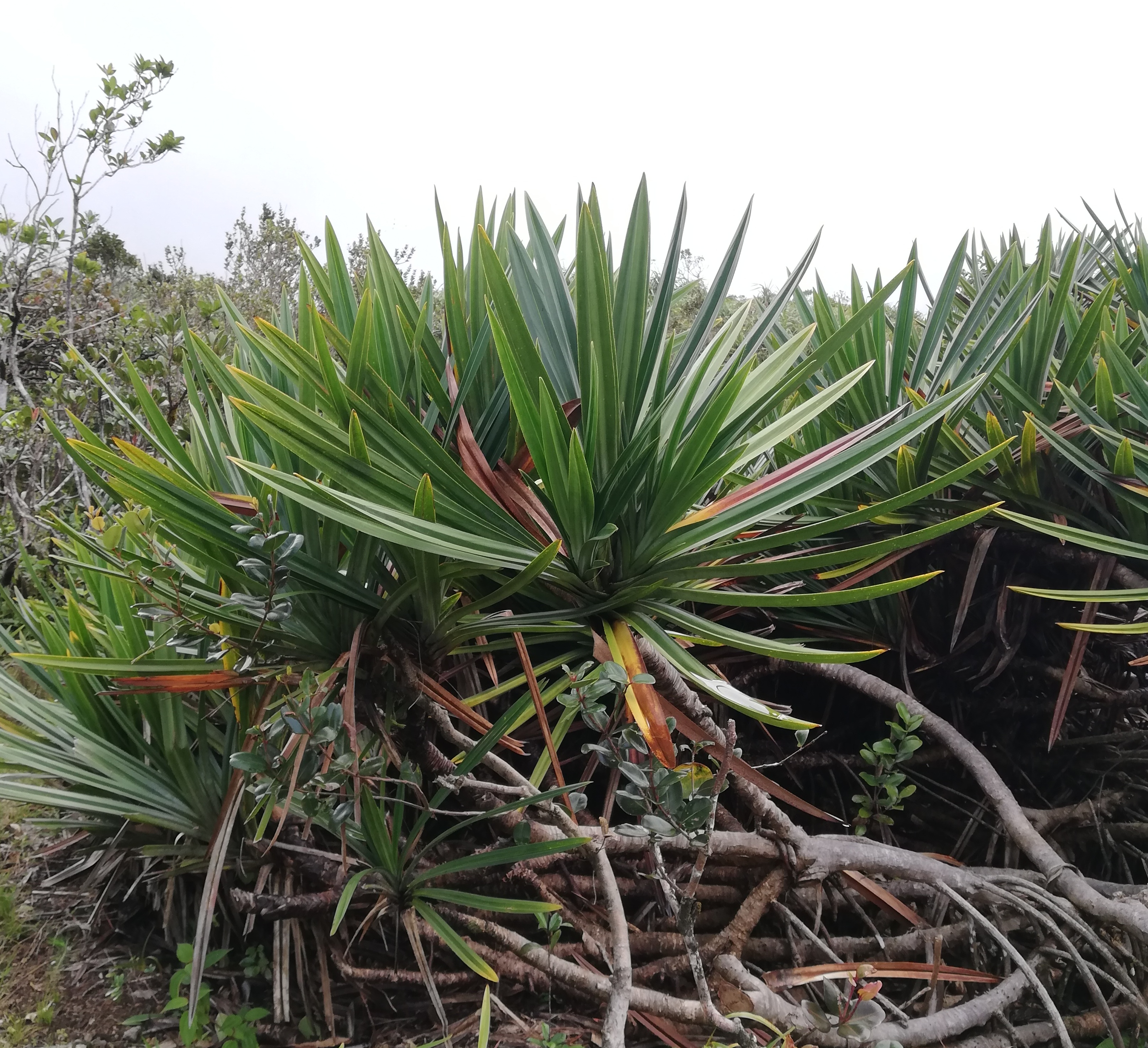
Pandanus rigidifolius in habitat.

It was endemic to Mauritius, where it was formerly common in the damp wetlands of the highlands near Le Petrin and Les Mares.
