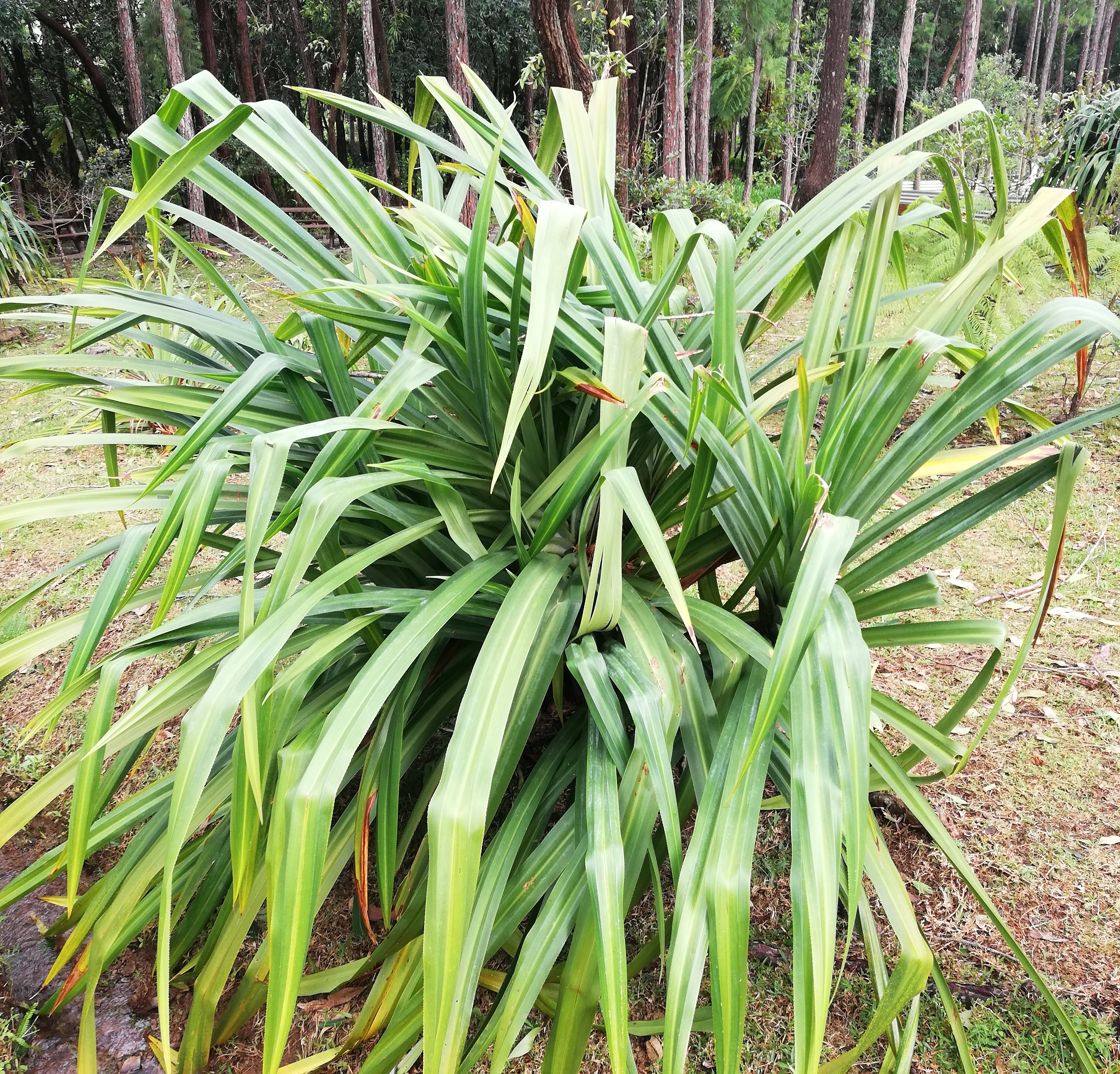
- A small Pandanus glaucocephalus specimen in cultivation, showing the slender, pale green leaves.

Scientific classification
- Kingdom: Plantae
- Clade: Tracheophytes
- Clade: Angiosperms
- Clade: Monocots
- Order: Pandanales
- Family: Pandanaceae
- Genus: Pandanus
- Species: P. glaucocephalus

Binomial name
- Pandanus glaucocephalus Balf.

= Pandanus glaucocephalus =

Species of flowering plant

Pandanus glaucocephalus is a species of plant in the family Pandanaceae, endemic to Mauritius.

== Description ==
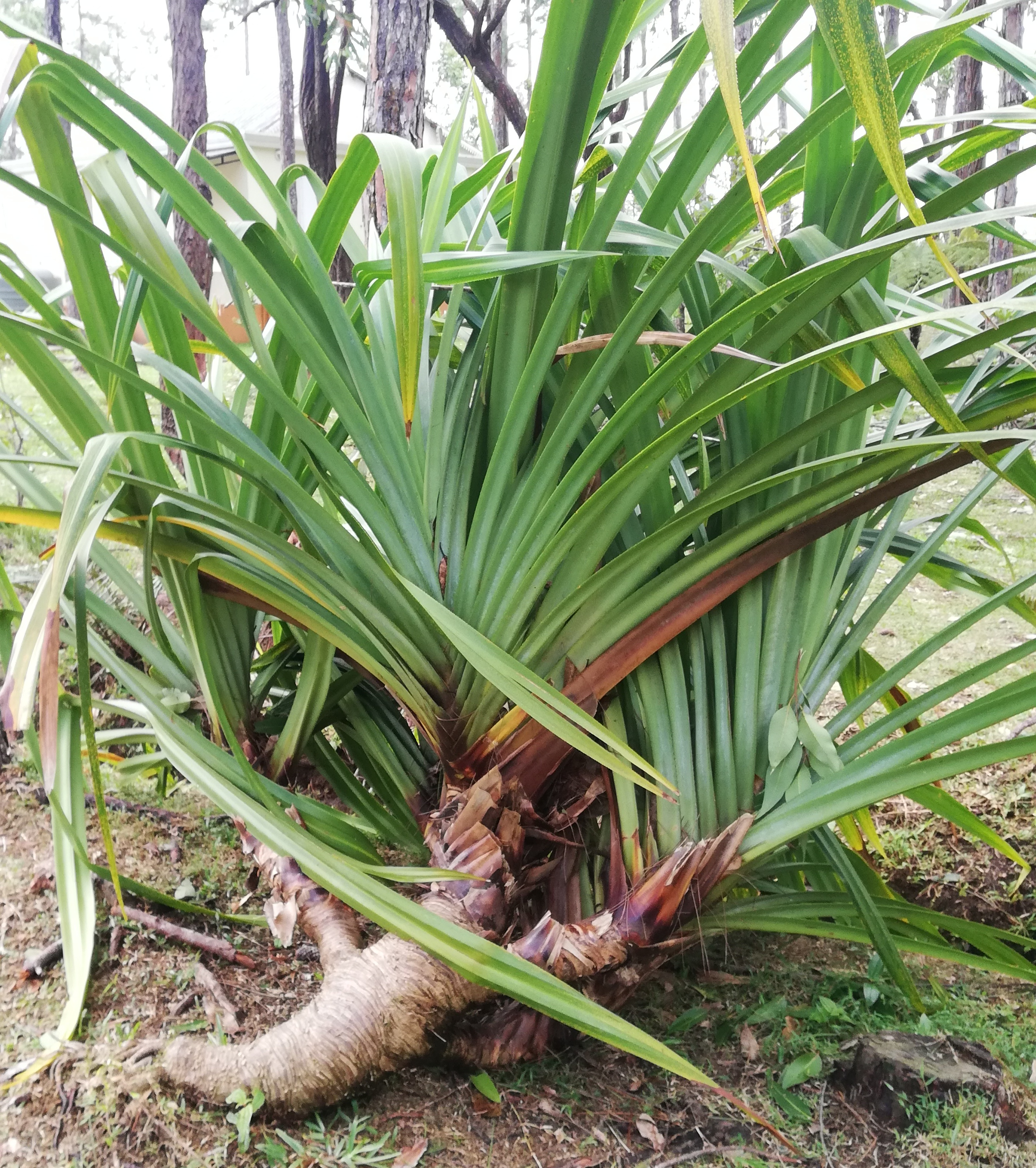
The grey trunk of Pandanus glaucocephalus barely has any stilt-roots.

A low (6-8m), branching tree. The 20 cm-wide trunk is grey, and bears only a few stilt-roots (or none at all), near the base of the stem. The leaves are slender and pale green. Leaf margins are lined with very tiny pale, yellow-brown spines. The leaf midrib also has spines, but not near the base. In its shape and growth form, this species most resembles the related Pandanus barkleyi.

This species is most easily distinguished by its 17–20 cm, globose, glaucous, blue-grey fruit-head. This is born on a short, fat stem, with long, slender, leaf-like bracts that extend further than the fruit-head. Each fruit-head holds 35-45 compressed or irregularly angled drupes. The drupes' exposed parts are raised and conical, with flattened or depressed tips, covered in cracks and scattered stigmas.

== Habitat ==
The Pandanus glaucocephalus is endemic to Mauritius, and grows in exposed, isolated patches in the highlands. It sometimes spreads vegetatively, rather than through seed. The leaf tufts can cause longer branches to break off and root on the ground where they fall. This can lead to large clumps forming.
