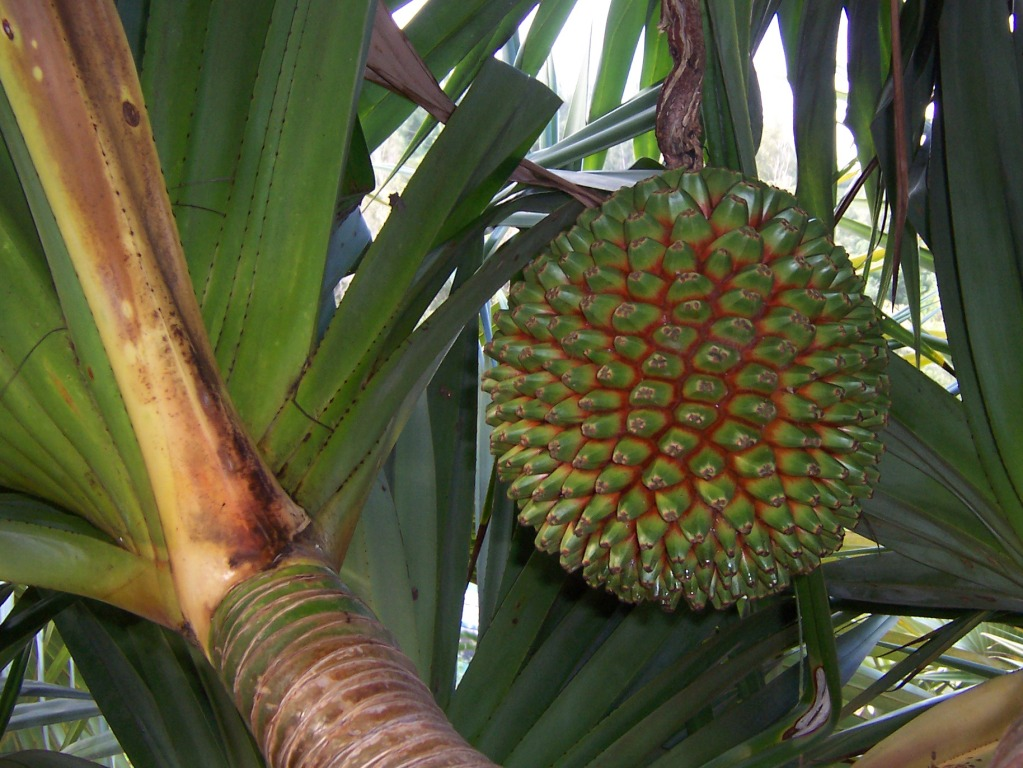
- Fruit of Pandanus utilis

Scientific classification
- Kingdom: Plantae
- Clade: Tracheophytes
- Clade: Angiosperms
- Clade: Monocots
- Order: Pandanales
- Family: Pandanaceae
- Genus: Pandanus; Parkinson

Species
- See List of Pandanus species

Synonyms
- 20 synonyms: Athrodactylis J.R.Forst. & G.Forst.; Barrotia Gaudich.; Bryantia Webb ex Gaudich.; Doornia de Vriese; Dorystigma Gaudich.; Eydouxia Gaudich.; Foullioya Gaudich.; Hasskarlia Walp.; Heterostigma Gaudich.; Hombronia Gaudich.; Jeanneretia Gaudich.; Keura Forssk.; Marquartia Hassk.; Pandanus Rumph. ex L.f.; Roussinia Gaudich.; Rykia de Vriese; Souleyetia Gaudich.; Sussea Gaudich.; Tuckeya Gaudich.; Vinsonia Gaudich.

= Pandanus =

Pandanus Temporal range: Oligocene-Recent 30–0 Ma

Genus of palm-like monocot trees and shrubs

Pandanus is a genus of monocots with about 578 accepted species. They are palm-like, dioecious trees and shrubs native to the Old World tropics and subtropics. Common names include pandan, screw palm and screw pine. The genus is classified in the order Pandanales, family Pandanaceae, and is the largest in the family.

== Description ==
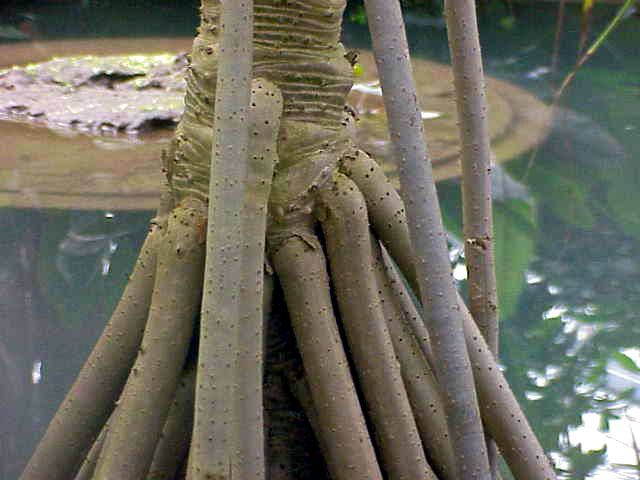
Aerial, prop roots

The species vary in size from small shrubs less than 1 metre (3 1/2 feet) tall, to medium-sized trees 20 m (66 ft) tall, typically with a broad canopy, heavy fruit, and moderate growth rate. The trunk is stout, wide-branching, and ringed with many leaf scars. Mature plants can have branches. Depending on the species, the trunk can be smooth, rough, or warty. The roots form a pyramidal tract to hold the trunk. They commonly have many thick stilt roots near the base, which provide support as the tree grows top-heavy with leaves, fruit, and branches. These roots are adventitious and often branched. The top of the plant has one or more crowns of strap-shaped leaves that may be spiny, varying between species from 30 centimetres (12 inches) to 2 m (6 1/2 ft) or longer, and from 1.5 cm (5/8 in) up to 10 cm (4 in) broad.

They are dioecious, with male and female flowers produced on different plants. The flowers of the male tree are 2–3 cm (3/4–1 1/4 in) long and fragrant, surrounded by narrow, white bracts. The female tree produces flowers with round fruits that are also bract-surrounded.

The individual fruit is a drupe, and these merge to varying degrees forming multiple fruit, a globule structure, 10–20 cm (4–8 in) in diameter and have many prism-like sections, resembling the fruit of the pineapple. Typically, the fruit changes from green to bright orange or red as it matures. The fruits can stay on the tree for more than 12 months.

== Evolution ==
The oldest credible fossil of the genus is Pandanus estellae, which is known from a silicified fruit found in Queensland, Australia, dating to the Oligocene epoch around 32–28 million years ago. Phylogenetic analyses of the maternal DNA of Pandanus has shown the genus to be divided into two large groups (Clade I and Clade II), with each of those groups further subdivided into two smaller groups (Subclade Ia, Subclade Ib, Subclade IIa, and Subclade IIb). The split between Clades I and II was determined to have occurred during the early Miocene, whereas the splits between Subclade Ia and Ib and between Subclade IIa and IIb were determined to have occurred during the Middle Miocene Climatic Optimum.

Nuclear target-capture genomics revealed that the evolutionary trajectory of the genus was heavily shaped by reticulate evolution and transoceanic adaptive introgression across the Indian Ocean. Nuclear data identified a key lineage, designated Clade Ba (which contains the widely-dispersed species Pandanus tectorius, among others), which has acted as a genetic and biogeographical "bridge" connecting Asian and Afro-Malagasy populations through bidirectional gene flow. Additionally, while geographically isolated "swamp" lineages across the Palaeotropics possess very similar morphological traits, nuclear analysis demonstrated that they do not share a hybrid origin; their shared characteristics are instead a product of convergent evolution driven by similar climatic pressures.

== Taxonomy ==
Though often called "pandanus palms", these plants are not closely related to palm trees. The genus is named after the Malay word pandan given to Pandanus amaryllifolius, the genus's most commonly known species. The name is derived from Proto-Austronesian *paŋudaN (which became Proto-Malayo-Polynesian *paŋdan and Proto-Oceanic *padran). It has many cognates in Austronesian languages, underscoring its importance in Austronesian cultures, including Atayal pangran; Kavalan pangzan; Thao panadan; Tagalog pandan; Chamorro pahong; Manggarai pandang; Malagasy fandrana, Tongan fā; Tahitian fara; Hawaiian hala all referring to plants of similar characteristics and/or uses whether in the same genus (particularly Pandanus tectorius) or otherwise (in the case of Māori whara or hara; e.g. harakeke). Pandanus is traditionally divided into six subgenera (Coronata, Kurzia, Lophostigma, Pandanus, Rykia, and Vinsonia); however, molecular phylogenetic analyses have shown these subgenera to not represent the true evolutionary history of Pandanus as all but Coronata are either polyphyletic or paraphyletic.

=== Selected species ===
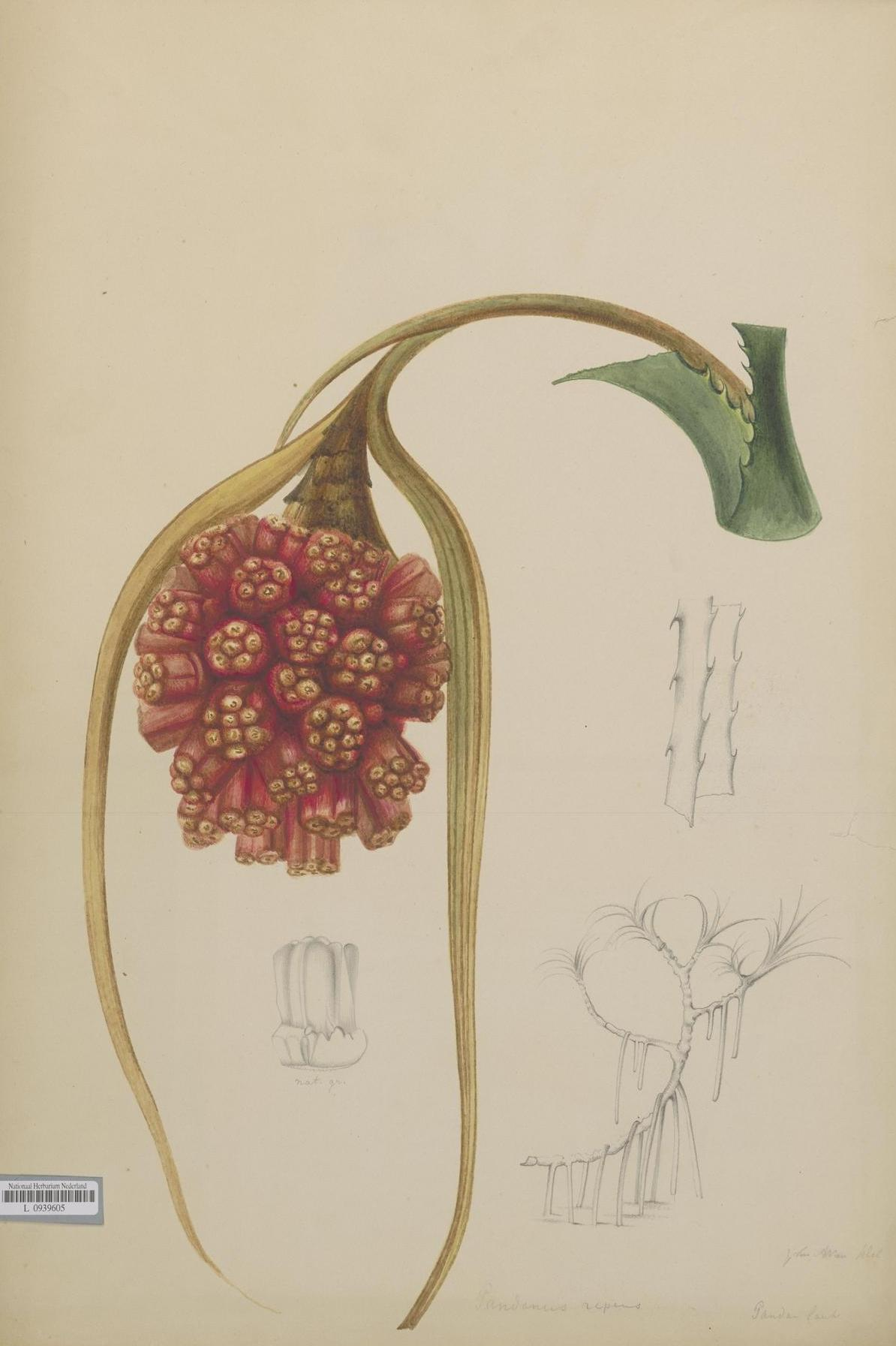
Pandanus repens

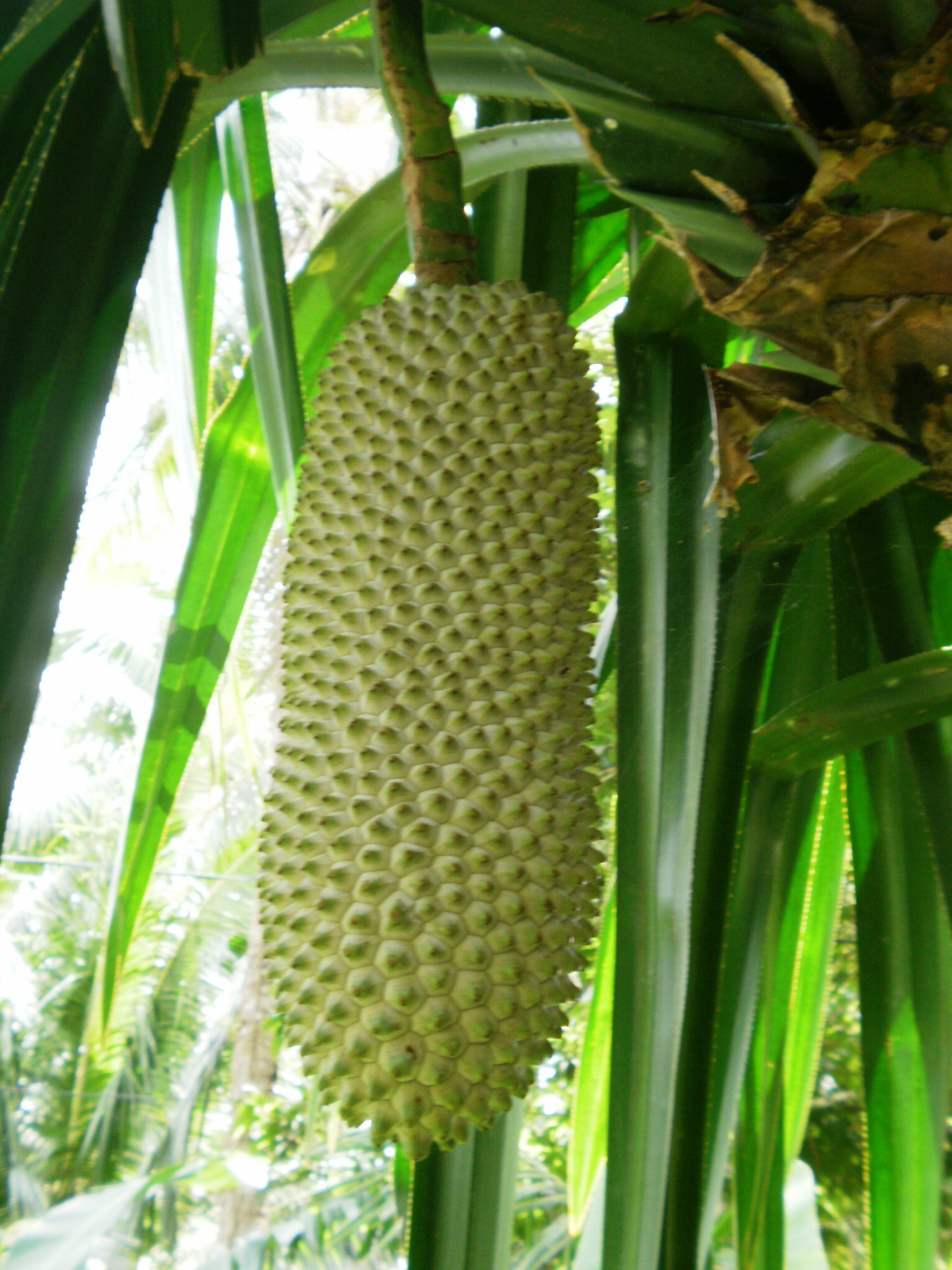
Pandanus simplex

Note: several species previously placed in Pandanus subgenera Acrostigma and Martellidendron are now in the distinct genera Benstonea and Martellidendron, respectively.

- Pandanus aldabraensis H.St.John
- Pandanus amaryllifolius Roxb. ex Lindl.
- Pandanus balfourii Martelli
- Pandanus barkleyi Balf.f.
- Pandanus boninensis Warb.
- Pandanus candelabrum P.Beauv.
- Pandanus carmichaelii R.E.Vaughan & Wiehe
- Pandanus ceylanicus Solms
- Pandanus christmatensis Martelli
- Pandanus clandestinus Stone
- Pandanus conglomeratus Balf.f.
- Pandanus conoideus Lam.
- Pandanus decastigma B.C.Stone
- Pandanus decipiens Martelli
- Pandanus decumbens Solms
- Pandanus drupaceus Thouars
- Pandanus elatus Ridl.
- Pandanus eydouxia Balf.f.
- Pandanus fanningensis H.St.John
- Pandanus forsteri C.Moore & F.Muell.
- Pandanus furcatus Roxb.
- Pandanus gabonensis Huynh
- Pandanus glaucocephalus R.E.Vaughan & Wiehe
- Pandanus grayorum Calim., Buerki & Gallaher
- Pandanus halleorum B.C.Stone
- Pandanus heterocarpus Balf.f.
- Pandanus iceryi Horne ex Balf.f.
- Pandanus incertus R.E.Vaughan & Wiehe
- Pandanus joskei Horne ex Balf.f.
- Pandanus julianettii Martelli
- Pandanus kaida Kurz
- Pandanus kajui Beentje
- Pandanus lacuum H.St.John ex B.C.Stone
- Pandanus laxespicatus Martelli
- Pandanus livingstonianus Rendle
- Pandanus leram Jones ex R.Millar
- Pandanus microcarpus Balf.f.
- Pandanus montanus Bory
- Pandanus multispicatus Balf.f.
- Pandanus odorifer (Forssk.) Kuntze
- Pandanus obeliscus Thouars
- Pandanus palustris Thouars
- Pandanus parvicentralis Huynh
- Pandanus prostratus Balf.f.
- Pandanus pyramidalis Barkly ex Balf.f.
- Pandanus rigidifolius R.E.Vaughan & Wiehe
- Pandanus sechellarum Balf.f.
- Pandanus spathulatus Martelli
- Pandanus spiralis R.Br.
- Pandanus tectorius Parkinson ex Du Roi
- Pandanus tenuifolius Balf.f.
- Pandanus teuszii Warb.
- Pandanus thomensis Henriq.
- Pandanus tonkinensis B.C.Stone
- Pandanus utilis Bory
- Pandanus vandermeeschii Balf.f.
- Pandanus verecundus Stone

== Distribution and habitat ==
Pandanus is a Paleotropical genus. The greatest number of species are found in Madagascar and Malaysia.

== Ecology ==
These plants grow from sea level to an altitude of 3,300 m (10,800 ft). Pandanus trees are of cultural, health, and economic importance in the Pacific, second only to the coconut on atolls. They grow wild mainly in semi-natural vegetation in littoral habitats throughout the tropical and subtropical Pacific, where they can withstand drought, strong winds, and salt spray. They propagate readily from seed, but popular cultivars are also widely propagated from branch cuttings by local people.

Species growing on exposed coastal headlands and along beaches have thick 'stilt roots' as anchors in the loose sand. Those stilt roots emerge from the stem, usually close to but above the ground, which helps to keep the plants upright and secure them to the ground.

While Pandanus are distributed throughout the tropical and subtropical islands and coastlines of the Atlantic, Indian and Pacific Oceans, they are most numerous on the low islands and barren atolls of Polynesia and Micronesia. Other species are adapted to mountain habitats and riverine forests.

The tree is grown and propagated from shoots that form spontaneously in the axils of lower leaves. Pandanus fruits are eaten by animals including bats, rats, crabs, and elephants, but the vast majority of species are dispersed primarily by water. Its fruit can float and spread to other islands without help from humans.

Climate and soil analyses based on a molecular phylogenetic framework have shown that the largest split in Pandanus (between Clades I and II) is also associated with a difference in climate and soil conditions between the two groups. Clade II Pandanus species are associated with more seasonal temperature and precipitation regimes, and more well-draining soils, than Clade I Pandanus species. In addition, this split is also associated with the occurrence of specialized layer of water storage tissue (also known as hydrenchyma) in Clade II species of Pandanus that is thought to aid in their adaptation to more water-stressed environments.

Nuclear phylogenomic evidence demonstrated that the ecological fixation of hydrenchyma across Clade II lineages was facilitated by chloroplast capture and adaptive introgression events, which directly coincided with regional Miocene forest contractions and an intensifying seasonality following the closure of the Tethys Sea. In addition, nuclear evidence has shown an evolutionary correlation between hydrenchyma and the morphology of the filaments in male flowers.

== Uses ==
Pandanus has multiple uses, which is dependent in part on each type and location. Some Pandanus are a source of food, while others provide raw material for clothing, basket weaving and shelter.

Pandanus leaves are used for handicrafts. Artisans collect the leaves from plants in the wild, cutting only mature leaves so that the plant will naturally regenerate. The leaves are sliced into fine strips and sorted for further processing. Weavers produce basic pandan mats of standard size or roll the leaves into pandan ropes for other designs. This is followed by a coloring process, in which pandan mats are placed in drums with water-based colors. After drying, the colored mats are shaped into final products, such as placemats or jewelry boxes. Final color touch-ups may be applied. The species in Hawaiʻi are called hala, and only the dry leaves (lauhala) are collected and used for Lauhala weaving. Traditions of weaving pandanus to source fabric material were widespread among Polynesians even as they migrated reaching colder latitudes (like the islands of New Zealand) where no pandanus grew, which later Māori generations simply adapted their skills with native plants like Phormium having superficially similar properties, even reflected in their names (e.g. the aforementioned harakeke, and wharariki).

Pandanus leaves from Pandanus amaryllifolius are used widely in Southeast Asian and South Asian cuisines to add a distinct aroma to various dishes and to complement flavors like chocolate. Because of their similarity in usage, pandan leaves are sometimes referred to as the "vanilla of Asia." Fresh leaves are typically torn into strips, tied in a knot to facilitate removal, placed in the cooking liquid, then removed at the end of cooking. Dried leaves and bottled extract may be bought in some places. Finely sliced pandan leaves are used as fragrant confetti for Malay weddings, graves etc.

Pandan leaves are known as Daun pandan in Indonesian and Malaysian Malay; Dahon ng pandan (lit. 'pandan leaf') or simply pandan in Filipino; 斑蘭 (bān lán) in Mandarin; as ใบเตย (bai toei; pronounced [bāj.tɤ̄ːj]) in Thai, lá dứa in Vietnamese; pulao data in Bengali; and rampe in Sinhalese and Hindi.

In India, particularly in Nicobar Islands, pandanus fruit is staple food of Shompen people and Nicobarese people.

In Sri Lanka, pandan leaves are used heavily in both vegetable and meat dishes and are often grown in homes. It is common practice to add a few pieces of pandan leaf when cooking red or white rice as well.

In Southeast Asia, pandan leaves are mainly used in sweets such as coconut jam and pandan cake. In Indonesia and Malaysia, pandan is also added to rice and curry dishes such as nasi lemak. In the Philippines, pandan leaves are commonly paired with coconut meat (a combination referred to as buko pandan) in various desserts and drinks like maja blanca and gulaman.

In Indian cooking, the leaf is added whole to biryani, a kind of rice pilaf, made with ordinary rice (as opposed to that made with the premium-grade basmati rice). The basis for this use is that both basmati and pandan leaf contains the same aromatic flavoring ingredient, 2-acetyl-1-pyrroline. In Sri Lanka, pandan leaves are a major ingredient used in the country's cuisine.

Kewra (also spelled Kevda or Kevada) is an extract distilled from the pandan flower, used to flavor drinks and desserts in Indian cuisine. Also, kewra or kevada is used in religious worship, and the leaves are used to make hair ornaments worn for their fragrance as well as decorative purpose in western India.

Species with large and medium fruit are edible, notably the many cultivated forms of P. tectorius (P. pulposus) and P. utilis. The ripe fruit can be eaten raw or cooked, while partly ripe fruit should be cooked first. Small-fruited pandanus may be bitter and astringent.

Karuka nuts (P. julianettii) are an important staple food in New Guinea. Over 45 cultivated varieties are known. Entire households will move, and in some areas will speak a pandanus language at harvest time. The taste is like coconut or walnuts.

Throughout Oceania, almost every part of the plant is used, with various species different from those used in Southeast Asian cooking. Pandanus trees provide materials for housing; clothing and textiles including the manufacture of dilly bags (carrying bags), fine mats or ʻie toga; sails, food, medication, decorations, fishing, and religious uses. In the Vanuatu Archipelago, natives make woven fish traps from the hard interior root of the pandanus, made like a cage having a narrow entrance.

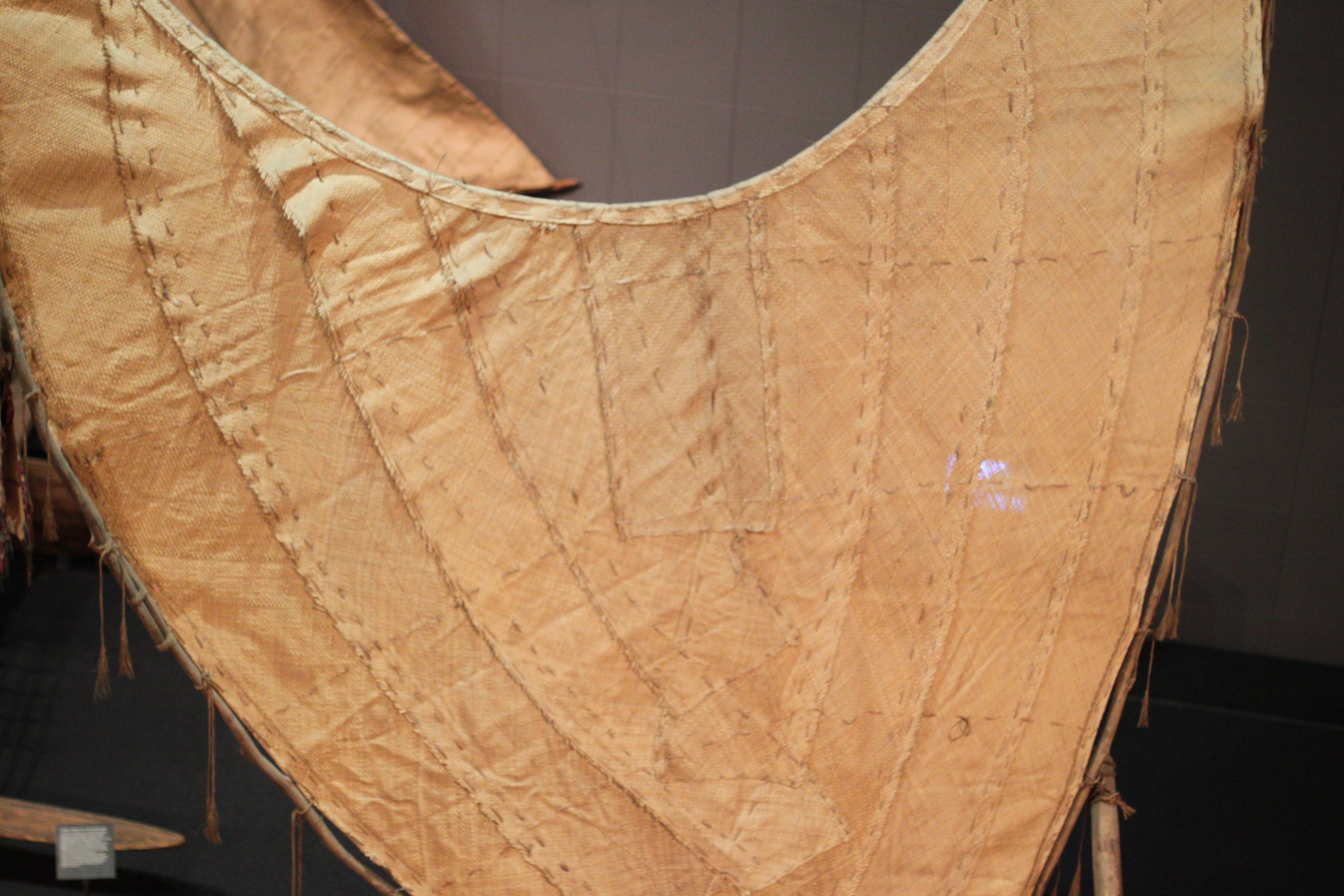
Crab claw sail woven from pandan leaves on a tepukei, an ocean-going outrigger canoe from Temotu, Solomon Islands

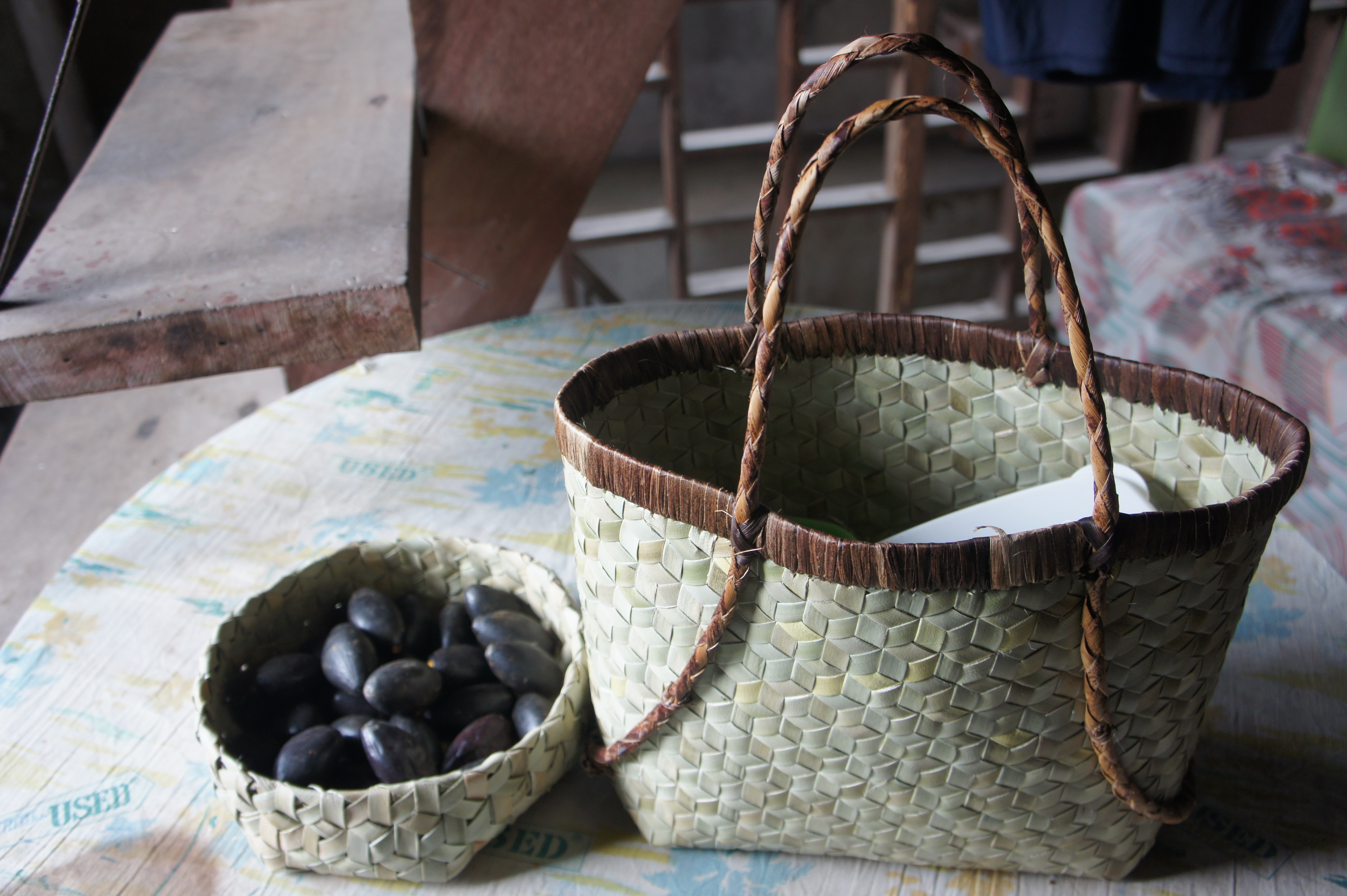
A bayong, a traditional Philippine basket woven from karagumoy (P. simplex) leaves in the hexagonal kinab-anan pattern

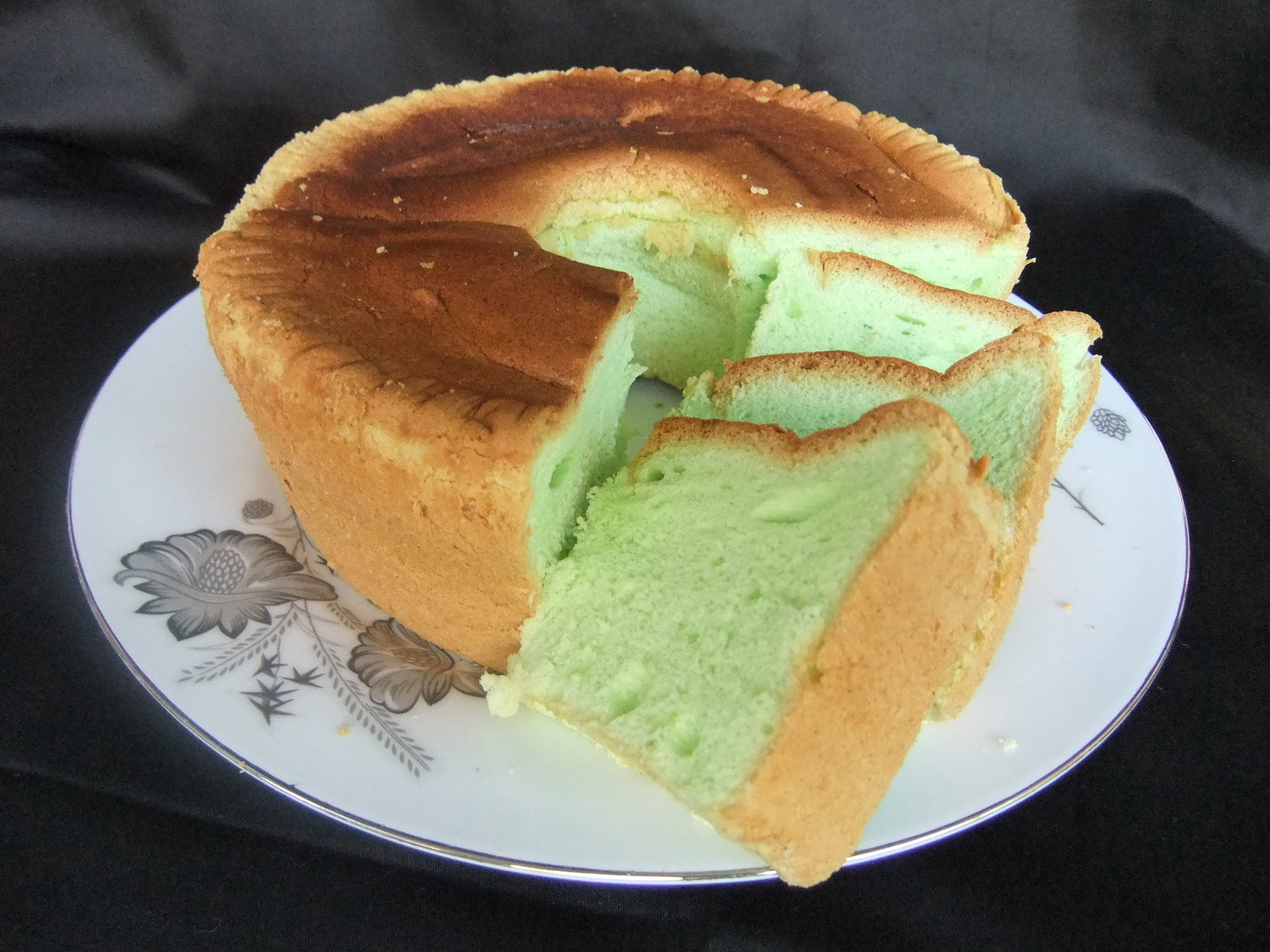
Pandan cake flavoured with pandan leaf extract

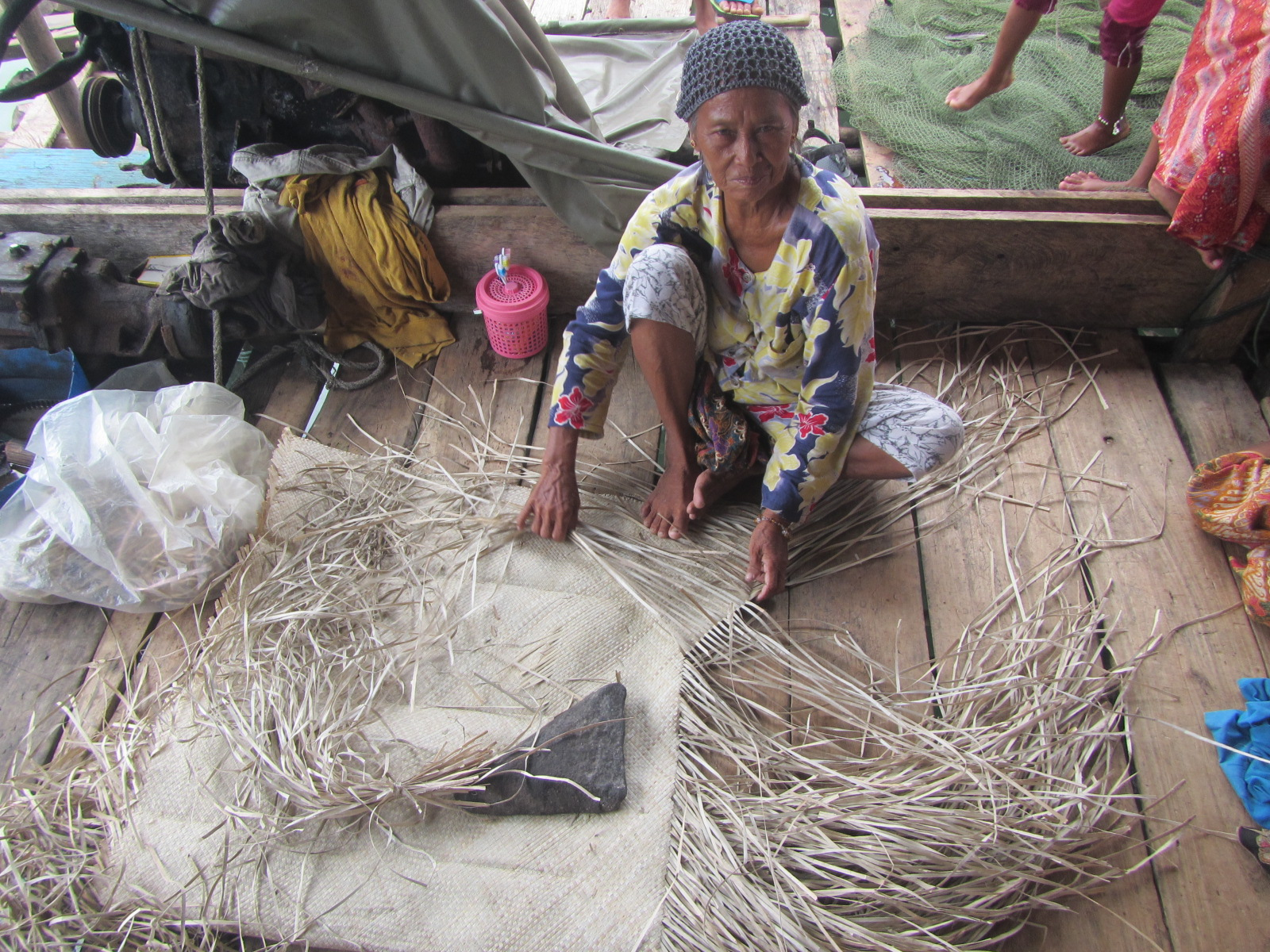
A Sama woman making a traditional mat (tepoh) from pandan leaves in Semporna, Sabah, Malaysia

== See also ==
- Domesticated plants and animals of Austronesia – Ancient expansion of agriculture
- Wa – Type of outrigger canoe from the Caroline Islands – vessels of the Caroline Islands which traditionally had pandanus mat sails
- Screw pine craft of Kerala – Traditional craft with screw pine in Kerala
