= Pandanus microcarpus =

Conservation status
- Critically Endangered (IUCN 2.3)

Scientific classification
- Kingdom: Plantae
- Clade: Tracheophytes
- Clade: Angiosperms
- Clade: Monocots
- Order: Pandanales
- Family: Pandanaceae
- Genus: Pandanus
- Species: P. microcarpus

Binomial name
- Pandanus microcarpus Balf.f.

Species of plant

Pandanus microcarpus is a species of plant in the family Pandanaceae, endemic to Mauritius.

== Description ==
This small (5-6m), slender, freely branching tree can be distinguished from its closest relatives by its drooping, dark yellow-green leaves with red marginal spines.

It can also easily be distinguished by its small (7–9 cm), oval, red to purple fruit-head, which is born on a twisted, recurved stalk. Each fruit-head is packed with 75-200 2.5 cm-long drupes. The exposed top of each drupe is flat or slightly convex (not forming a domed or pyramid shape). Unusually for its genus, it sometimes bears staminodes.

== Habitat ==
It is endemic to Mauritius, where it was once widespread. Its habitat is now largely destroyed. Its natural habitats are rivers and swamps in medium-rainfall areas of Mauritius.
