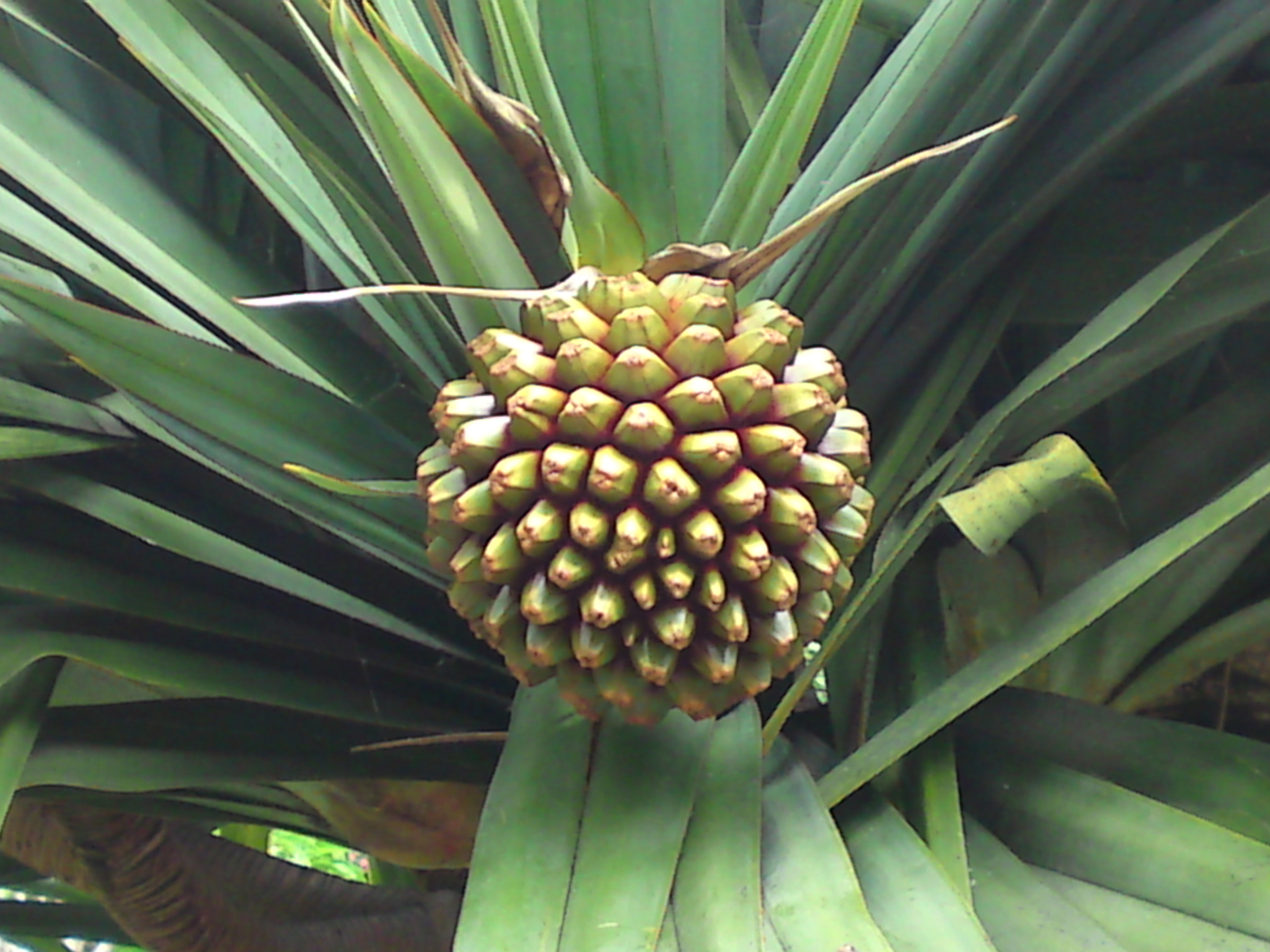

Scientific classification
- Kingdom: Plantae
- Clade: Tracheophytes
- Clade: Angiosperms
- Clade: Monocots
- Order: Pandanales
- Family: Pandanaceae
- Genus: Pandanus
- Species: P. utilis

Binomial name
- Pandanus utilis Bory

Synonyms
- 21 synonyms: Pandanus sativus Thouars; Hasskarlia globosa (Hassk.) Walp.; Marquartia globosa Hassk.; Pandanus distichus Anon.; Pandanus elegantissimus J.Veitch f.; Pandanus flabelliformis Carrière; Pandanus maritimus Thouars; Pandanus mauritianus Lem.; Pandanus nudus Thouars; Pandanus odoratissimus Jacq.; Pandanus spurius Miq.; Pandanus utilis var. stephanocarpa (Gaudich.) Brongn.; Pandanus vacqua Carmich. ex Balf.f.; Vinsonia consanguinea Gaudich. ex Balf.f.; Vinsonia macrostigma Gaudich. ex Balf.f.; Vinsonia media Gaudich. ex Balf.f.; Vinsonia propinqua Gaudich. ex Balf.f.; Vinsonia stephanocarpa Gaudich.; Vinsonia striata Gaudich. ex Balf.f.; Vinsonia thouarsii Gaudich. ex Balf.f.; Vinsonia utilis Gaudich.

= Pandanus utilis =

Species of tree

Pandanus utilis, commonly known as common screwpine or pimento thatch, is a species of monocot in the genus Pandanus, native to the Mascarene Islands of Mauritius, Rodrigues, and Réunion, and naturalised in Madagascar (where it has often been thought native), the Seychelles, and elsewhere.

== Description ==
Within the family Pandanaceae, the genus Pandanus composes the largest genus. It is estimated that there are between 500 and 1,000 species within this genus; the Plants of the World Online database accepts 562 species. Pandanus utilis, otherwise known as the common screwpine, is one species in this genus. It was discovered by the French naturalist Jean Baptiste Bory de Saint-Vincent in 1801–02 and described in 1804. The origin of P. utilis has traditionally been thought to be Madagascar, but more recently the Mascarene Islands have been suggested as a possible place of origin. A long history of cultivation and transport to many parts of the world makes the origin difficult to trace. However, it is now grown in Senegal, Benin, Tanzania, Madagascar, Réunion, Maldives and Mauritius. P. utilis has been introduced to many tropical and subtropical regions, including Central America, the Caribbean, the United States (southern Florida, Puerto Rico), Brazil, India, Japan (Okinawa), and Indonesia.

=== Morphology ===
Pandanus utilis is a palm-like evergreen tree, ranging in height up to 20 metres (66 ft). As with many Pandanus, the trunk has aerial prop roots. It is found in tropical areas, and has an upright trunk that is smooth with many horizontal spreading branches with annular leaf scars. Old leaf scars spiral around the branches and trunk, like a screw. The anatomy of Pandanaceae stems can be distinguished from other monocotyledons by the presence of a compound vascular bundle. This bi- or tripolar vascular bundle has two or three distinct conduction strands encased by a common bundle sheath. At the end of each branch is a spiral cluster of long, linear leaves with a pectinate (comb-like) edge tapering to a long point at the apex. This margin is filled with small reddish teeth. The leaves are produced in a spiral arrangement on the tree; they are simple without lobes, 0.5–2 m (1.6–6.6 ft) long and 6–10 cm (2.4–3.9 in) broad, with red spines on the margins. They are without petioles and are broadly clasped at the base, and are blue/green to dark green, rather stiff, and with a waxy texture. The leaf venation is parallel running longitudinal. They have a spongy tissue with numerous fibres arranged in bundles. These bundles can contain over 150 fibres.

As with other member of the genus Pandanus, it lacks secondary growth. The secondary growth of most trees is the production of wood to aid in support of the trunk. Without this supportive structure, P. utilis grows many pale brown prop roots at the base of the trunk. These adventitious roots arise from the stem above the soil level and help support the plant. These roots not only anchor the tree but also keep it upright during times of heavy winds and rain in tropical regions. The prop roots can be 2.5 to 7.5 centimetres (0.98 to 2.95 in) diameter.

P. utilis is dioecious, with the female and male reproducing structures occurring on different plants. Individual plants are either male, producing microspores, or female, producing megaspores. This plant being unisexual allows it to cross-fertilize with other individuals. The male plants produce fragrant creamy-white flowers in long spikes. These long spikes have 8–12 stamens inserted in a pseudo-umbel on slender columns 10 to 15 millimetres (0.39 to 0.59 in) long. The female plants produce fruit slightly resembling oversized pine cones, changing from green to yellow, orange, or reddish when ripe. The female structure has a 3–8 celled ovary crowned by a sessile stigma.

This species is naturalised in several of the Mascarene islands, where it coexists with a number of other indigenous and endemic Pandanus species. It can usually be distinguished from these however, by the tip of the free portion of each drupe of its fruit-head, which usually does not have an areole. The tip is usually also cleft between the stigmas. The fruit-heads are very variable, but usually stand out by being up to 20 cm wide and containing 100–200 drupes.

== Ecology ==
P. utilis grows well near the sea, being salt-tolerant. It is a strictly tropical tree that will not survive frost. It grows in full sun to partial shade but prefers at least 6 hours of direct sunlight. Seeds take two to three months to germinate.

== Use and management ==
Common screwpine has many uses. In coastal areas, it has been used for erosion control due to its numerous aerial roots. These roots help bind the sand dunes along the coast from eroding water and wind. The leaves of are used in different cultures for thatching and the production of numerous materials. Care must be taken when handling the leaves because of their sharp spines. In areas like Madagascar, Réunion and Mauritius, the leaves are used to make ropes, baskets, mats, hats, place mats, nets, thatched roofs for homes and even paper. The waxy covering over the leaves makes them especially attractive for baskets and roofs with their natural water-resistant surface. The fruit forms a starchy food and can be eaten after being cooked.

== Chemical Composition ==
Pandalisines A and B are two novel indolizidine alkaloids from this plant.

== Pests and Diseases ==
Few diseases have been recorded on members of the Pandanaceae within Papua New Guinea or worldwide. With the exception of a single suspected virus disease causing yellow mottling on the leaves and an MLO disease causing decline in P. utilis in Florida all diseases recorded on Pandanus have been caused by fungal pathogens. No major pests are of much concern to this plant.

== Gallery ==
Pandanus utilis
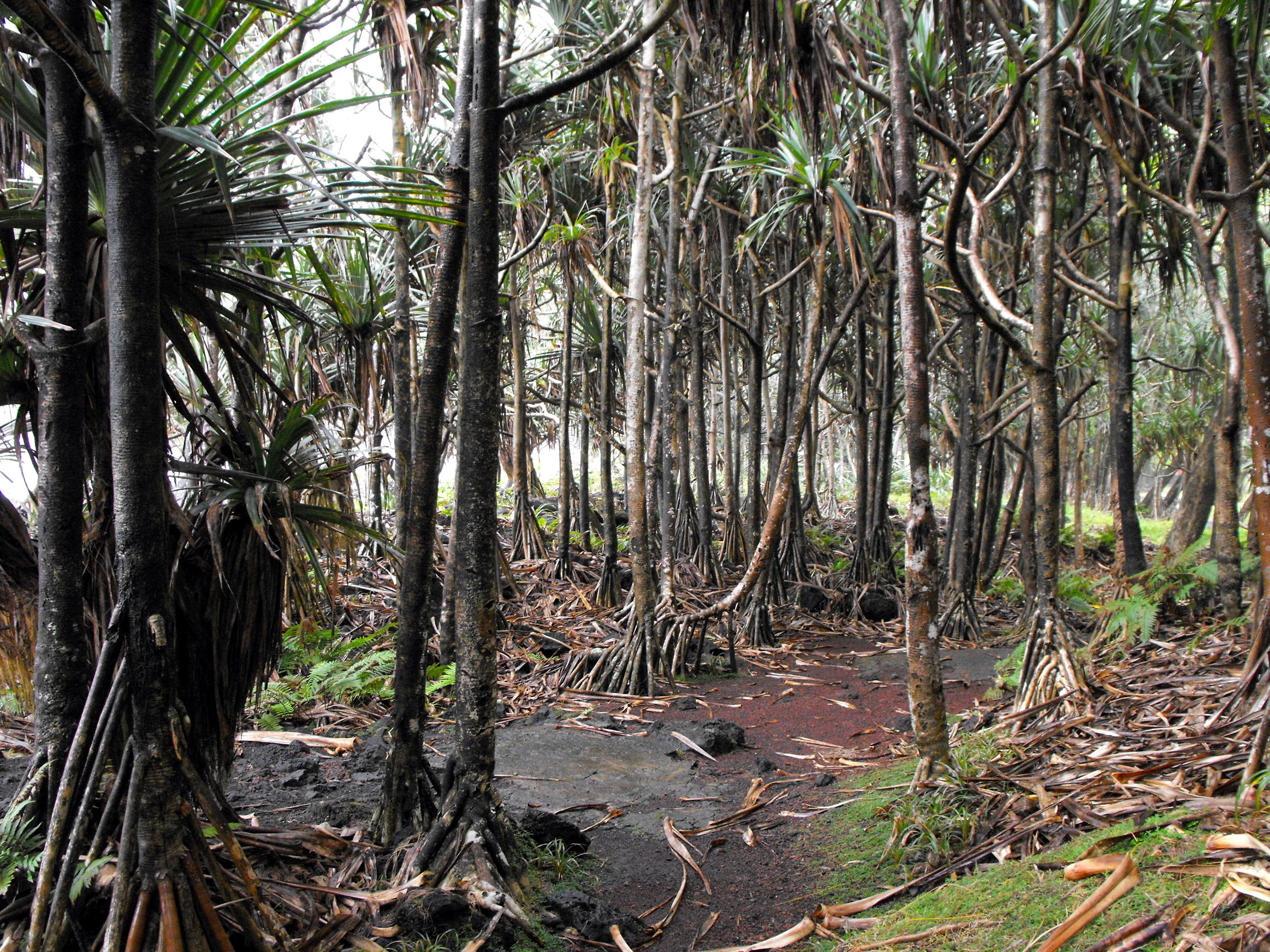
In Réunion

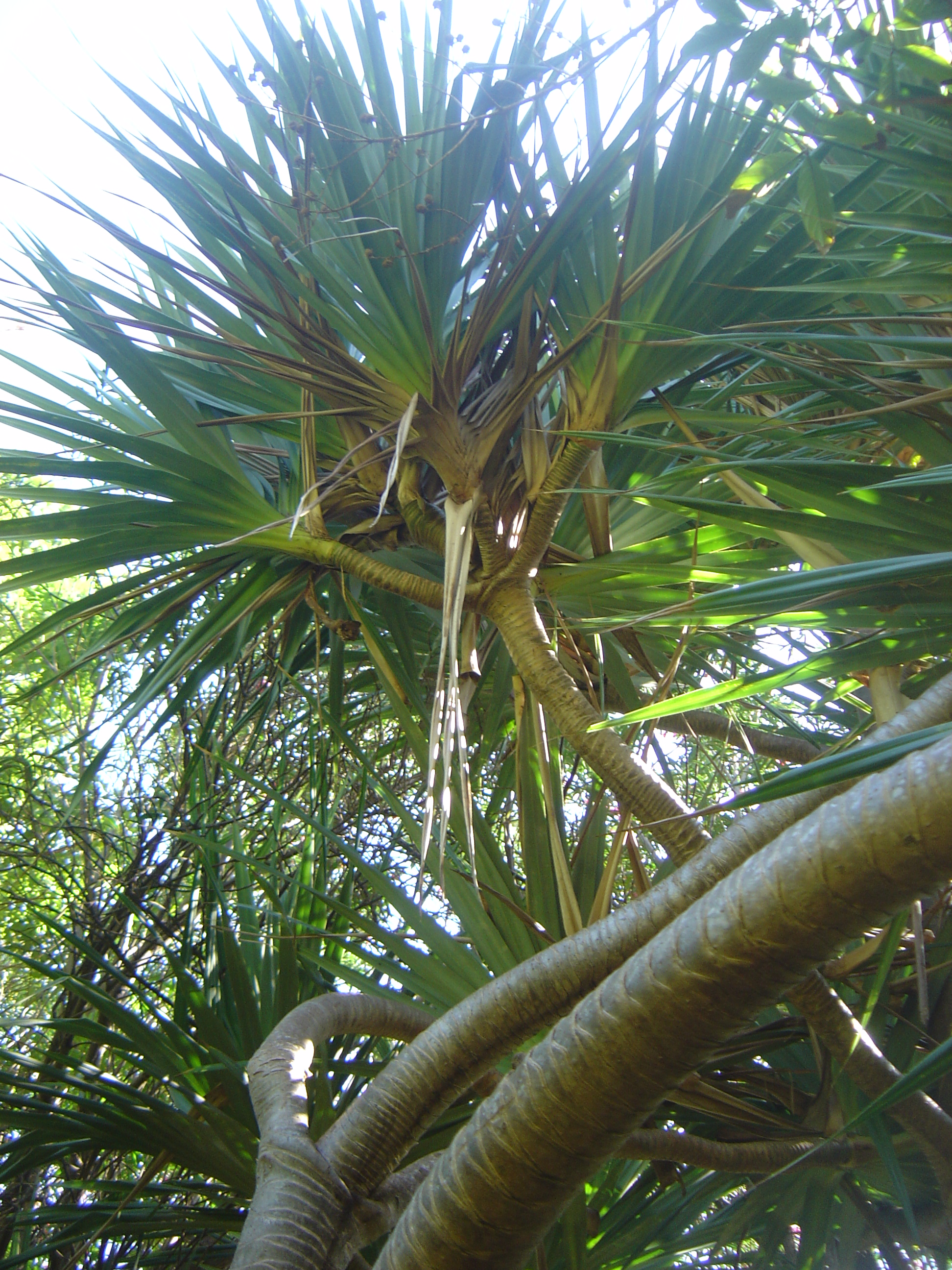
Foliage

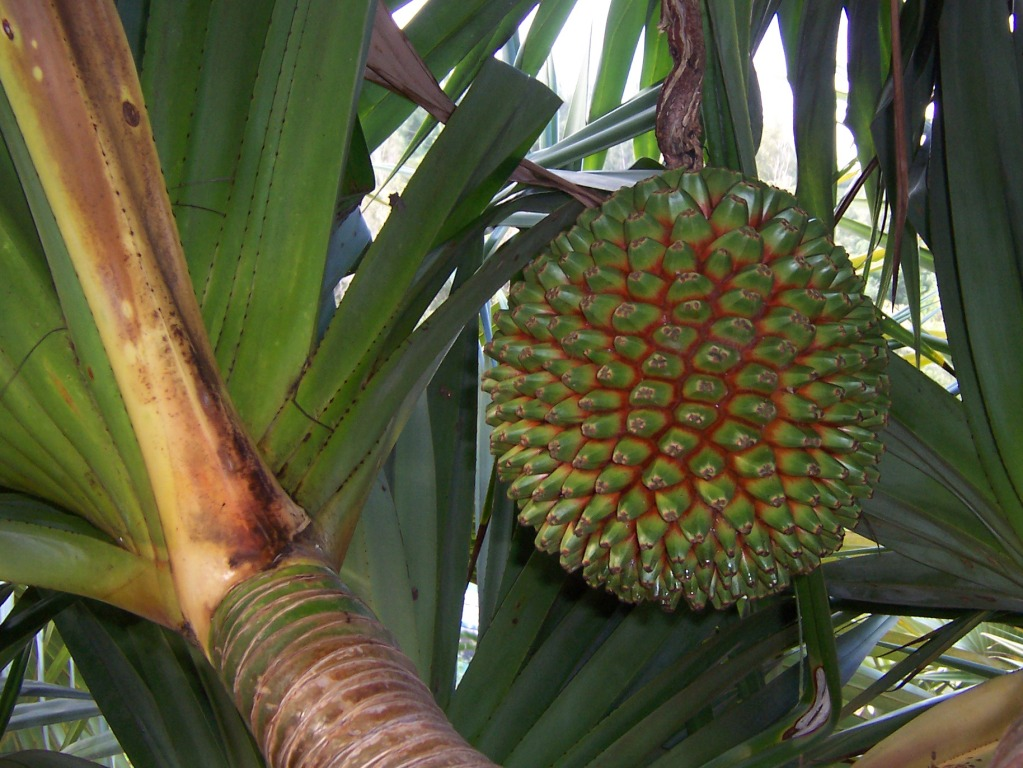
Fruit

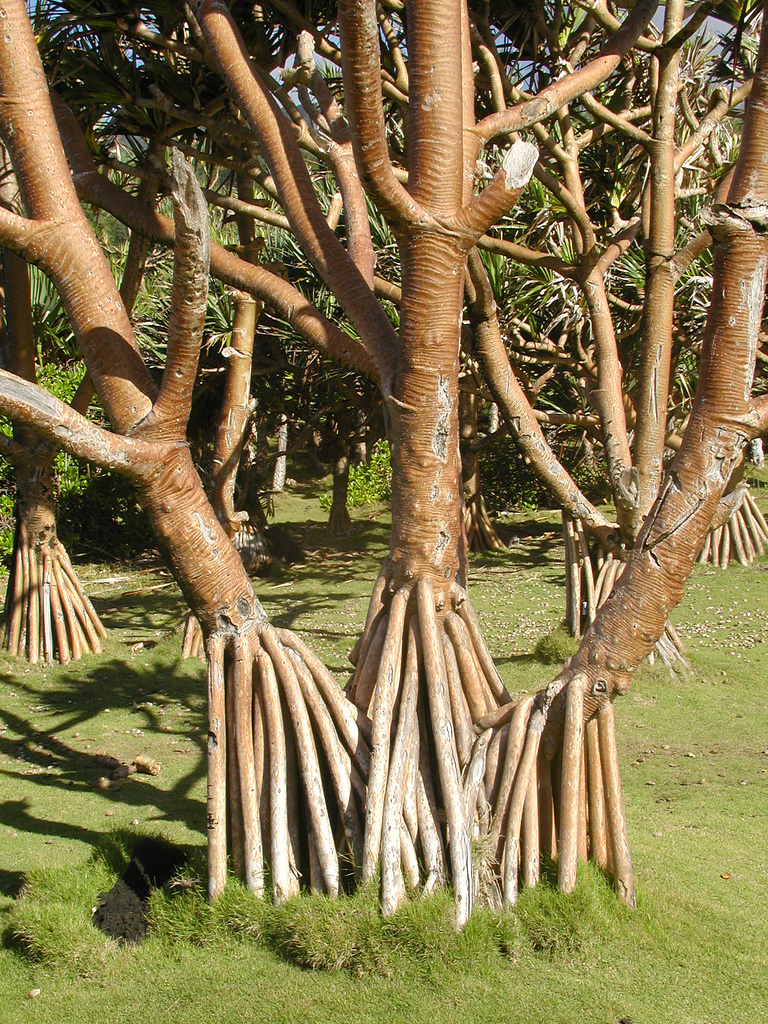
Stilt roots

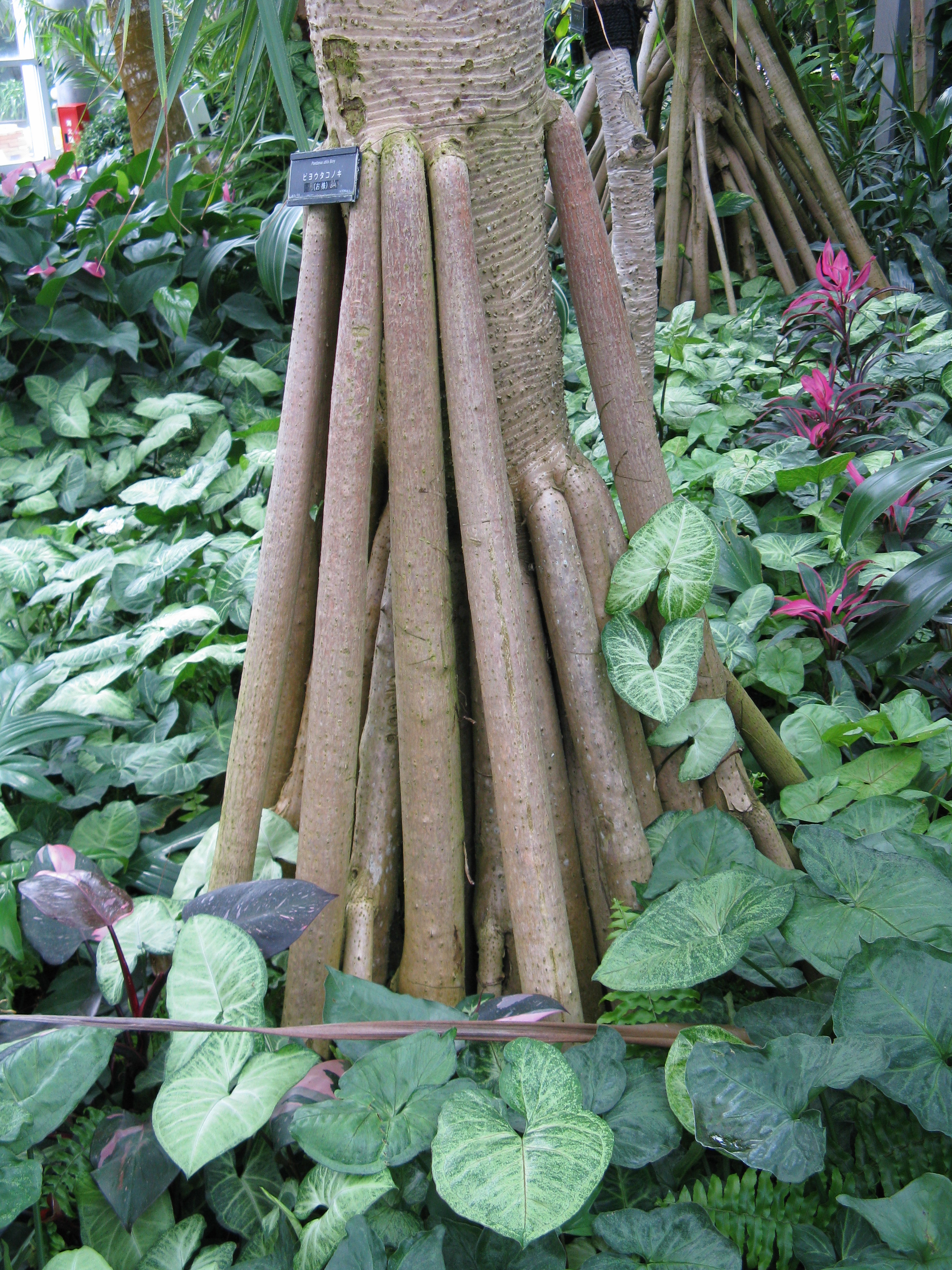
Roots

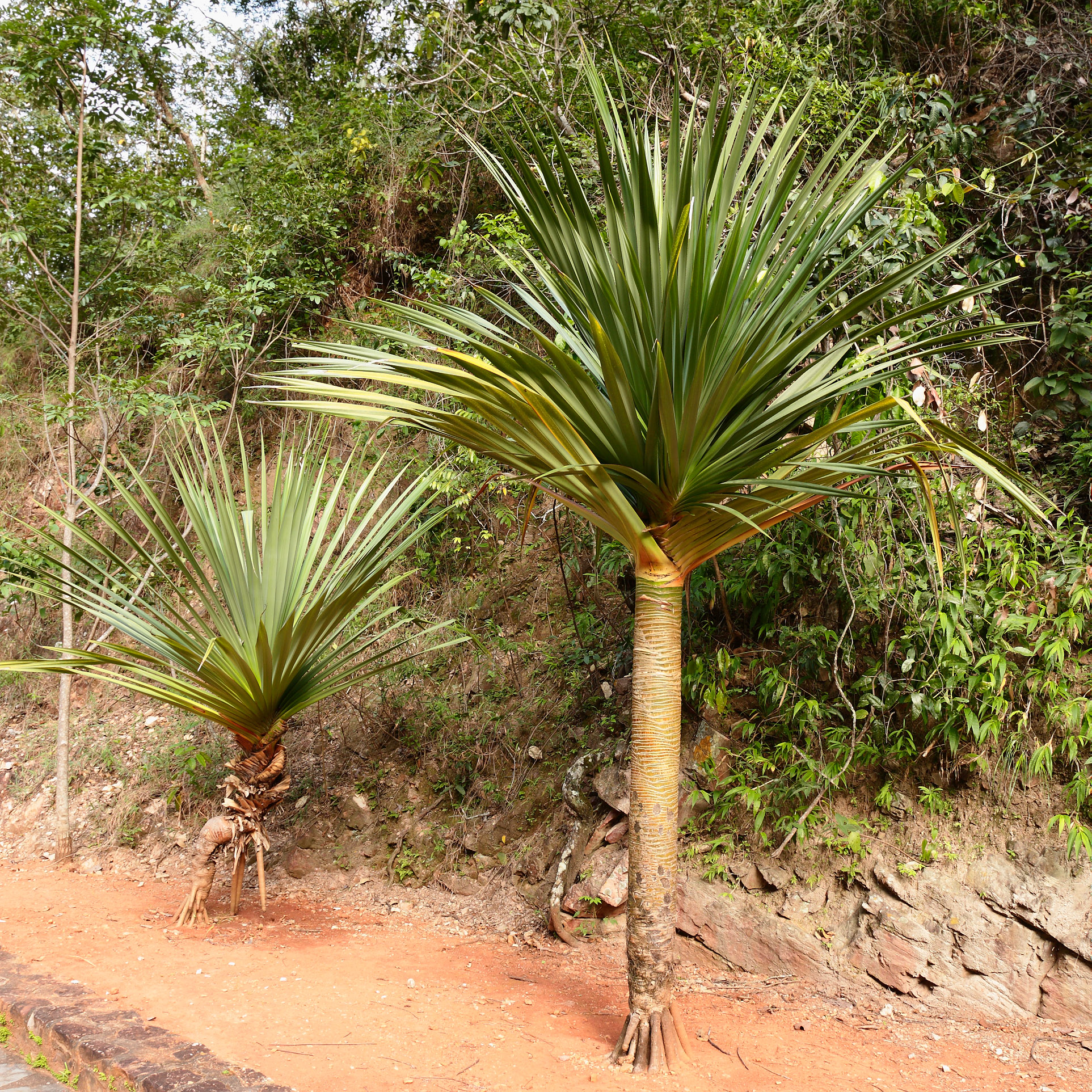
In Brazil

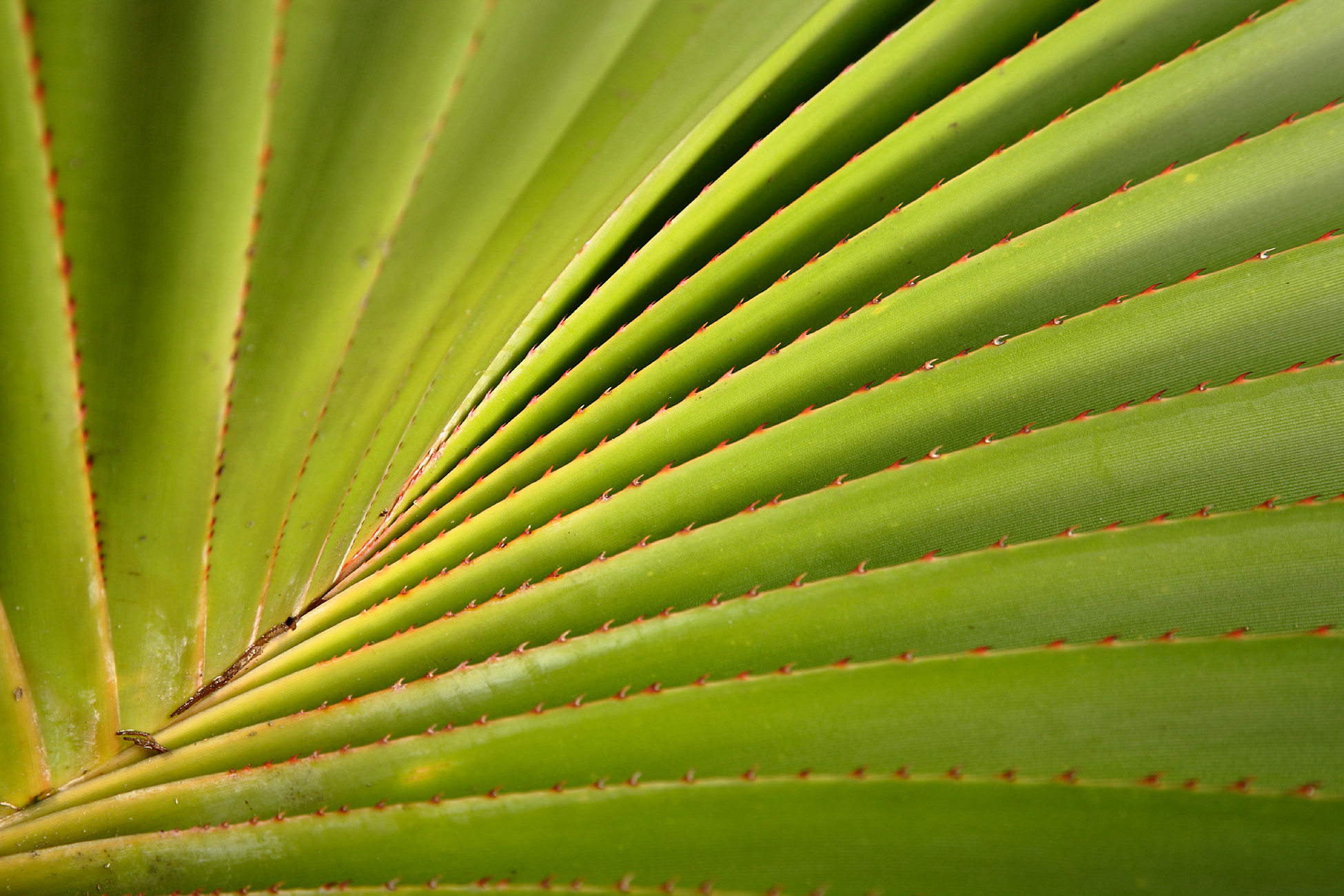
Leaves

== See also ==
- Indolizine
- Swainsonine
- Heyneanine
- Domesticated plants and animals of Austronesia
