= Dactylispa julii =

Scientific classification
- Kingdom: Animalia
- Phylum: Arthropoda
- Class: Insecta
- Order: Coleoptera
- Suborder: Polyphaga
- Infraorder: Cucujiformia
- Family: Chrysomelidae
- Genus: Dactylispa
- Species: D. julii

Binomial name
- Dactylispa julii Uhmann, 1932

Synonyms
- Dactylispa filicornis Weise, 1912 (preocc.)

Species of beetle

Dactylispa julii is a species of beetle of the family Chrysomelidae. It is found in Cameroon and Nigeria.

== Life history ==
No host plant has been documented for this species.
