= Dactylispa bodongi =

Scientific classification
- Kingdom: Animalia
- Phylum: Arthropoda
- Class: Insecta
- Order: Coleoptera
- Suborder: Polyphaga
- Infraorder: Cucujiformia
- Family: Chrysomelidae
- Genus: Dactylispa
- Species: D. bodongi

Binomial name
- Dactylispa bodongi Uhmann, 1930

Synonyms
- Dactylispa bodongi haafi Uhmann, 1961

Species of beetle

Dactylispa bodongi is a species of beetle of the family Chrysomelidae. It is found in Congo, Mozambique, South Africa and Zimbabwe.

No host plant has been documented for this species.
