= Dactylispa pallipes =

Scientific classification
- Kingdom: Animalia
- Phylum: Arthropoda
- Class: Insecta
- Order: Coleoptera
- Suborder: Polyphaga
- Infraorder: Cucujiformia
- Family: Chrysomelidae
- Genus: Dactylispa
- Species: D. pallipes

Binomial name
- Dactylispa pallipes (Kraatz, 1895)

Synonyms
- Hispa pallipes Kraatz, 1895; Dactylispa misella Weise, 1901; Dactylispa flavipes Weise, 1911; Dactylispa pallipes brunnescens Uhmann, 1954

Species of beetle

Dactylispa pallipes is a species of beetle of the family Chrysomelidae. It is found in Cameroon, Congo, Equatorial Guinea, Eritrea, Ethiopia, Guinea, Ivory Coast, Kenya, Nigeria, Sierra Leone, Tanzania, Togo, Uganda and Zimbabwe.

== Life history ==
The recorded host plant for this species is Setaria chevalieri.
