= Dactylispa melanosticta =

Scientific classification
- Kingdom: Animalia
- Phylum: Arthropoda
- Class: Insecta
- Order: Coleoptera
- Suborder: Polyphaga
- Infraorder: Cucujiformia
- Family: Chrysomelidae
- Genus: Dactylispa
- Species: D. melanosticta

Binomial name
- Dactylispa melanosticta (Baly, 1890)

Synonyms
- Hispa melanosticta Baly, 1890

Species of beetle

Dactylispa melanosticta is a species of beetle of the family Chrysomelidae. It is found in India and Vietnam.

== Life history ==
No host plant has been documented for this species.
