= Dactylispa longicornis =

Scientific classification
- Kingdom: Animalia
- Phylum: Arthropoda
- Class: Insecta
- Order: Coleoptera
- Suborder: Polyphaga
- Infraorder: Cucujiformia
- Family: Chrysomelidae
- Genus: Dactylispa
- Species: D. longicornis

Binomial name
- Dactylispa longicornis (Motschulsky, 1861)

Synonyms
- Hispa longicornis Motschulsky, 1861; Hispa severinii Gestro, 1897; Dactylispa andrewesi Weise, 1897

Species of beetle

Dactylispa longicornis is a species of beetle of the family Chrysomelidae. It is found in India (Bihar, Karnataka, Kerala, Maharashtra) and Thailand.

== Life history ==
No host plant has been documented for this species.
