= Dactylispa serrulata =

Scientific classification
- Kingdom: Animalia
- Phylum: Arthropoda
- Class: Insecta
- Order: Coleoptera
- Suborder: Polyphaga
- Infraorder: Cucujiformia
- Family: Chrysomelidae
- Genus: Dactylispa
- Species: D. serrulata

Binomial name
- Dactylispa serrulata Chen & Tan, 1964

Species of beetle

Dactylispa serrulata is a species of beetle of the family Chrysomelidae. It is found in China (Heilongjiang, Jiangsu) and Taiwan.

== Life history ==
No host plant has been documented for this species.
