= Dactylispa kambaitica =

Scientific classification
- Kingdom: Animalia
- Phylum: Arthropoda
- Class: Insecta
- Order: Coleoptera
- Suborder: Polyphaga
- Infraorder: Cucujiformia
- Family: Chrysomelidae
- Genus: Dactylispa
- Species: D. kambaitica

Binomial name
- Dactylispa kambaitica Uhmann, 1939

Species of beetle

Dactylispa kambaitica is a species of beetle of the family Chrysomelidae. It is found in China (Yunnan) and Myanmar.

== Life history ==
No host plant has been documented for this species.
