= Dactylispa spinipes =

Scientific classification
- Kingdom: Animalia
- Phylum: Arthropoda
- Class: Insecta
- Order: Coleoptera
- Suborder: Polyphaga
- Infraorder: Cucujiformia
- Family: Chrysomelidae
- Genus: Dactylispa
- Species: D. spinipes

Binomial name
- Dactylispa spinipes Weise, 1905

Synonyms
- Dactylispa krishna Maulik, 1919

Species of beetle

Dactylispa spinipes is a species of beetle of the family Chrysomelidae. It is found in India (Kerala, Karnataka, Tamil Nadu) and Thailand.

== Life history ==
No host plant has been documented for this species.
