= Dactylispa lameyi =

Scientific classification
- Kingdom: Animalia
- Phylum: Arthropoda
- Class: Insecta
- Order: Coleoptera
- Suborder: Polyphaga
- Infraorder: Cucujiformia
- Family: Chrysomelidae
- Genus: Dactylispa
- Species: D. lameyi

Binomial name
- Dactylispa lameyi Uhmann, 1930

Species of beetle

Dactylispa lameyi is a species of beetle of the family Chrysomelidae. It is found in China (Guangxi, Yunnan) and Vietnam.

== Life history ==
The recorded host plant for this species is Phragmites communis.
