= Dactylispa burmana =

Scientific classification
- Kingdom: Animalia
- Phylum: Arthropoda
- Class: Insecta
- Order: Coleoptera
- Suborder: Polyphaga
- Infraorder: Cucujiformia
- Family: Chrysomelidae
- Genus: Dactylispa
- Species: D. burmana

Binomial name
- Dactylispa burmana Uhmann, 1939

Species of beetle

Dactylispa burmana is a species of beetle of the family Chrysomelidae. It is found in China (Yunnan), Laos and Myanmar.

No host plant has been documented for this species.
