= Dactylispa callosa =

Scientific classification
- Kingdom: Animalia
- Phylum: Arthropoda
- Class: Insecta
- Order: Coleoptera
- Suborder: Polyphaga
- Infraorder: Cucujiformia
- Family: Chrysomelidae
- Genus: Dactylispa
- Species: D. callosa

Binomial name
- Dactylispa callosa Uhmann, 1935

Species of beetle

Dactylispa callosa is a species of beetle of the family Chrysomelidae. It is found in South Africa.

== Life history ==
The recorded host plants for this species are grasses (Poaceae).
