= Dactylispa sarawakensis =

Scientific classification
- Kingdom: Animalia
- Phylum: Arthropoda
- Class: Insecta
- Order: Coleoptera
- Suborder: Polyphaga
- Infraorder: Cucujiformia
- Family: Chrysomelidae
- Genus: Dactylispa
- Species: D. sarawakensis

Binomial name
- Dactylispa sarawakensis Uhmann, 1943

Synonyms
- Dactylispa armata Uhmann, 1930 (preocc.)

Species of beetle

Dactylispa sarawakensis is a species of beetle of the family Chrysomelidae. It is found in Malaysia.

== Life history ==
No host plant has been documented for this species.
