= Dactylispa tewfiki =

Scientific classification
- Kingdom: Animalia
- Phylum: Arthropoda
- Class: Insecta
- Order: Coleoptera
- Suborder: Polyphaga
- Infraorder: Cucujiformia
- Family: Chrysomelidae
- Genus: Dactylispa
- Species: D. tewfiki

Binomial name
- Dactylispa tewfiki Pic, 1939

Species of beetle

Dactylispa tewfiki is a species of beetle of the family Chrysomelidae. It is found in Egypt.

== Life history ==
No host plant has been documented for this species.
