= Dactylispa confluens =

Scientific classification
- Kingdom: Animalia
- Phylum: Arthropoda
- Class: Insecta
- Order: Coleoptera
- Suborder: Polyphaga
- Infraorder: Cucujiformia
- Family: Chrysomelidae
- Genus: Dactylispa
- Species: D. confluens

Binomial name
- Dactylispa confluens (Baly, 1889)

Synonyms
- Hispa confluens Baly, 1889; Hispa platyprioides Gestro, 1890; Dactylispa vestita Maulik, 1919

Species of beetle

Dactylispa confluens is a species of beetle of the family Chrysomelidae. It is found in Bangladesh, China (Yunnan), India, Laos, Myanmar, Nepal, Thailand and Vietnam.

== Life history ==
The recorded host plants for this species are Prunus species.
