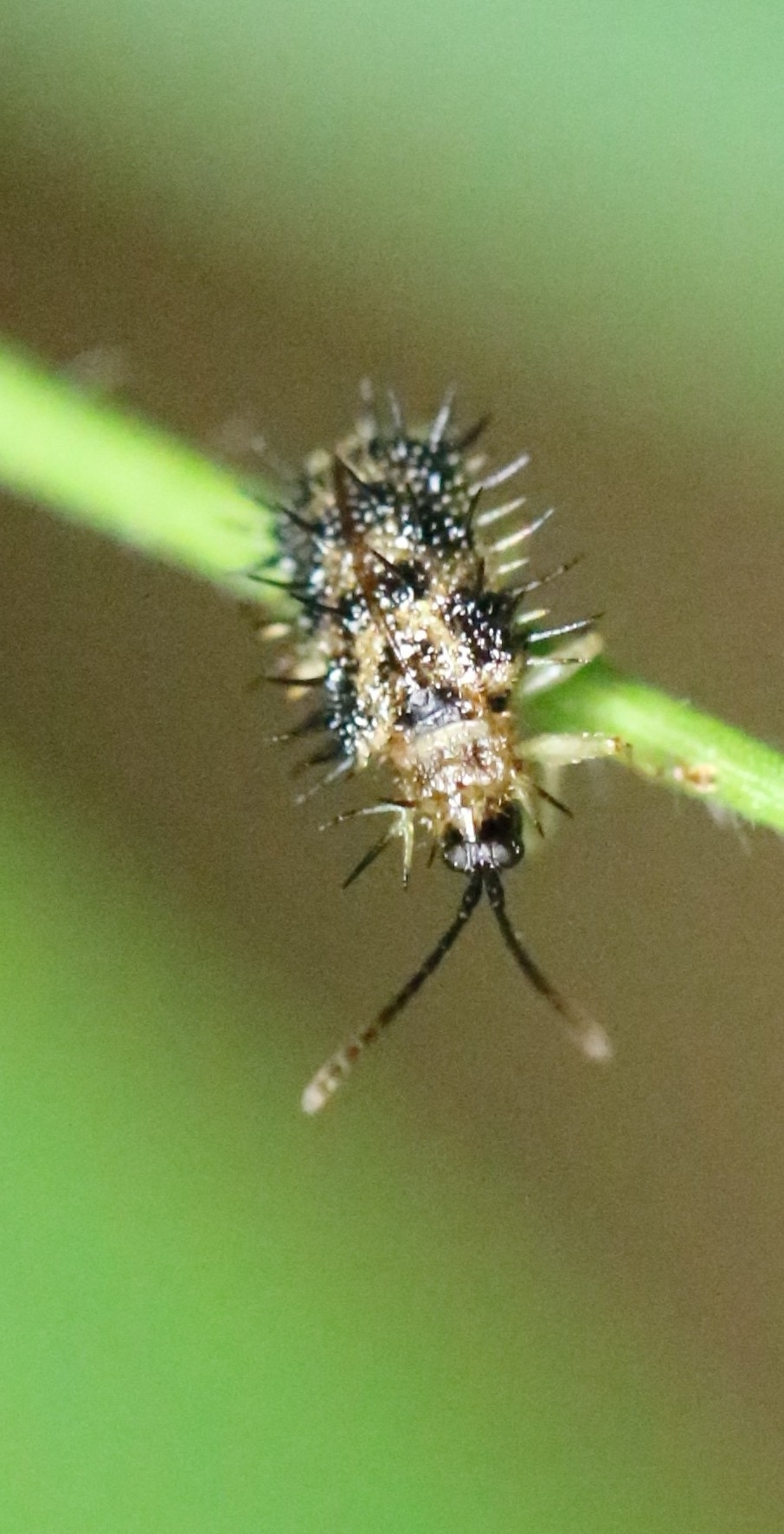

Scientific classification
- Kingdom: Animalia
- Phylum: Arthropoda
- Class: Insecta
- Order: Coleoptera
- Suborder: Polyphaga
- Infraorder: Cucujiformia
- Family: Chrysomelidae
- Genus: Dactylispa
- Species: D. nigromaculata

Binomial name
- Dactylispa nigromaculata (Motschulsky, 1861)

Synonyms
- Hispa nigromaculata Motschulsky, 1861; Hispa xanthospila Gestro, 1890

= Dactylispa nigromaculata =

Species of beetle

Dactylispa nigromaculata is a species of beetle of the family Chrysomelidae. It is found in Myanmar and eastern, southern and south-western China.

== Life history ==
The recorded host plants for this species are Poaceae species (including Pogonatherum crinitum and Arthraxon prionodes). They mine the leaves of their host plant.
