= Dactylispa hystrix =

Scientific classification
- Kingdom: Animalia
- Phylum: Arthropoda
- Class: Insecta
- Order: Coleoptera
- Suborder: Polyphaga
- Infraorder: Cucujiformia
- Family: Chrysomelidae
- Genus: Dactylispa
- Species: D. hystrix

Binomial name
- Dactylispa hystrix (Duvivier, 1891)

Synonyms
- Hispa hystrix Duvivier, 1891

Species of beetle

Dactylispa hystrix is a species of beetle of the family Chrysomelidae. It is found in Madagascar.

== Life history ==
The recorded host plant for this species is Panicum glanduliferum.
