= Dactylispa protuberance =

Scientific classification
- Kingdom: Animalia
- Phylum: Arthropoda
- Class: Insecta
- Order: Coleoptera
- Suborder: Polyphaga
- Infraorder: Cucujiformia
- Family: Chrysomelidae
- Genus: Dactylispa
- Species: D. protuberance

Binomial name
- Dactylispa protuberance Tan, 1982

Species of beetle

Dactylispa protuberance is a species of beetle of the family Chrysomelidae. It is found in China (Guangxi).

== Life history ==
No host plant has been documented for this species.
