= Dactylispa elegantula =

Scientific classification
- Kingdom: Animalia
- Phylum: Arthropoda
- Class: Insecta
- Order: Coleoptera
- Suborder: Polyphaga
- Infraorder: Cucujiformia
- Family: Chrysomelidae
- Genus: Dactylispa
- Species: D. elegantula

Binomial name
- Dactylispa elegantula (Duvivier, 1892)

Synonyms
- Hispa elegantula Duvivier, 1892; Dactylispa bilasa Maulik, 1919

Species of beetle

Dactylispa elegantula is a species of beetle of the family Chrysomelidae. It is found in Bangladesh, India (Assam, Sikkim, Uttar Pradesh, West Bengal) and Nepal.

== Life history ==
No host plant has been documented for this species.
