= Dactylispa nigritula =

Scientific classification
- Kingdom: Animalia
- Phylum: Arthropoda
- Class: Insecta
- Order: Coleoptera
- Suborder: Polyphaga
- Infraorder: Cucujiformia
- Family: Chrysomelidae
- Genus: Dactylispa
- Species: D. nigritula

Binomial name
- Dactylispa nigritula (Guérin-Méneville, 1841)

Synonyms
- Hispa nigritula Guérin-Méneville, 1841; Hispa nigritula atratula Guérin-Méneville, 1841

Species of beetle

Dactylispa nigritula is a species of beetle of the family Chrysomelidae. It is found in Nigeria and Senegal.

== Life history ==
The recorded host plant for this species is Pennisetum dichotomum.
