= Dactylispa corpulenta =

Scientific classification
- Kingdom: Animalia
- Phylum: Arthropoda
- Class: Insecta
- Order: Coleoptera
- Suborder: Polyphaga
- Infraorder: Cucujiformia
- Family: Chrysomelidae
- Genus: Dactylispa
- Species: D. corpulenta

Binomial name
- Dactylispa corpulenta Weise, 1897

Species of beetle

Dactylispa corpulenta is a species of beetle of the family Chrysomelidae. It is found in China (Hainan, Yunnan), India (Kerala, Karnataka), Laos, Nepal, Taiwan and Vietnam.

== Life history ==
No host plant has been documented for this species.
