= Dactylispa binotaticollis =

Scientific classification
- Kingdom: Animalia
- Phylum: Arthropoda
- Class: Insecta
- Order: Coleoptera
- Suborder: Polyphaga
- Infraorder: Cucujiformia
- Family: Chrysomelidae
- Genus: Dactylispa
- Species: D. binotaticollis

Binomial name
- Dactylispa binotaticollis Chen & Tan, 1964

Species of beetle

Dactylispa binotaticollis is a species of beetle of the family Chrysomelidae. It is found in China (Guangxi, Yunnan).

No host plant has been documented for this species.
