= Dactylispa perfida =

Scientific classification
- Kingdom: Animalia
- Phylum: Arthropoda
- Class: Insecta
- Order: Coleoptera
- Suborder: Polyphaga
- Infraorder: Cucujiformia
- Family: Chrysomelidae
- Genus: Dactylispa
- Species: D. perfida

Binomial name
- Dactylispa perfida (Péringuey, 1898)

Synonyms
- Hispa perfida Péringuey, 1898; Dactylispa suahelorum Weise, 1899

Species of beetle

Dactylispa perfida is a species of beetle of the family Chrysomelidae. It is found in Congo, Kenya, Rwanda and South Africa.

== Life history ==
No host plant has been documented for this species.
