= Dactylispa delkeskampi =

Scientific classification
- Kingdom: Animalia
- Phylum: Arthropoda
- Clade: Pancrustacea
- Class: Insecta
- Order: Coleoptera
- Suborder: Polyphaga
- Infraorder: Cucujiformia
- Family: Chrysomelidae
- Genus: Dactylispa
- Species: D. delkeskampi

Binomial name
- Dactylispa delkeskampi Uhmann, 1958

Synonyms
- Hispa dimidiata Gestro, 1885 (preocc. Hispa dimidiata Olivier, 1808)

Species of beetle

Dactylispa delkeskampi is a species of beetle of the family Chrysomelidae. It is found in Indonesia (Borneo, Sulawesi) and the Philippines (Bohol).

== Life history ==
No host plant has been documented for this species.
