= Dactylispa clavata =

Scientific classification
- Kingdom: Animalia
- Phylum: Arthropoda
- Class: Insecta
- Order: Coleoptera
- Suborder: Polyphaga
- Infraorder: Cucujiformia
- Family: Chrysomelidae
- Genus: Dactylispa
- Species: D. clavata

Binomial name
- Dactylispa clavata Weise, 1902

Synonyms
- Dactylispa natalensis Uhmann, 1930

Species of beetle

Dactylispa clavata is a species of beetle of the family Chrysomelidae. It is found in Angola, Eritrea, Ethiopia, Saudi Arabia, South Africa, Sudan, Tanzania, Uganda and Yemen.

== Life history ==
No host plant has been documented for this species.
