= Dactylispa calaviteana =

Scientific classification
- Kingdom: Animalia
- Phylum: Arthropoda
- Class: Insecta
- Order: Coleoptera
- Suborder: Polyphaga
- Infraorder: Cucujiformia
- Family: Chrysomelidae
- Genus: Dactylispa
- Species: D. calaviteana

Binomial name
- Dactylispa calaviteana Uhmann, 1932

Synonyms
- Dactylispa calaviteana posticalis Uhmann, 1964

Species of beetle

Dactylispa calaviteana is a species of beetle of the family Chrysomelidae. It is found in the Philippines (Luzon, Mindanao, Mindoro).

== Life history ==
No host plant has been documented for this species.
