= Dactylispa spinulifera =

Scientific classification
- Kingdom: Animalia
- Phylum: Arthropoda
- Class: Insecta
- Order: Coleoptera
- Suborder: Polyphaga
- Infraorder: Cucujiformia
- Family: Chrysomelidae
- Genus: Dactylispa
- Species: D. spinulifera

Binomial name
- Dactylispa spinulifera Uhmann, 1931

Species of beetle

Dactylispa spinulifera is a species of beetle of the family Chrysomelidae. It is found in Cameroon, Congo, Equatorial Guinea, Ivory Coast and Togo.

== Life history ==
No host plant has been documented for this species.
