= Dactylispa perrotetii =

Scientific classification
- Kingdom: Animalia
- Phylum: Arthropoda
- Clade: Pancrustacea
- Class: Insecta
- Order: Coleoptera
- Suborder: Polyphaga
- Infraorder: Cucujiformia
- Family: Chrysomelidae
- Genus: Dactylispa
- Species: D. perrotetii

Binomial name
- Dactylispa perrotetii (Guérin-Méneville, 1841)

Synonyms
- Hispa perrotetii Guérin-Méneville, 1841; Hispa brunnipes Motschulsky, 1861; Hispa trifida Chapuis, 1877; Dactylispa flavolimbata Gestro, 1909; Dactylispa xanthospila picipes Uhmann, 1935; Dactylispa malayana Gestro, 1909

Species of beetle

Dactylispa perrotetii is a species of beetle of the family Chrysomelidae. It is found in India (Tamil Nadu, West Bengal), Indonesia (Borneo, Java, Sumatra), Malaysia and the Philippines (Palawan).

== Life history ==
The recorded host plants for this species are grasses (Poaceae).
