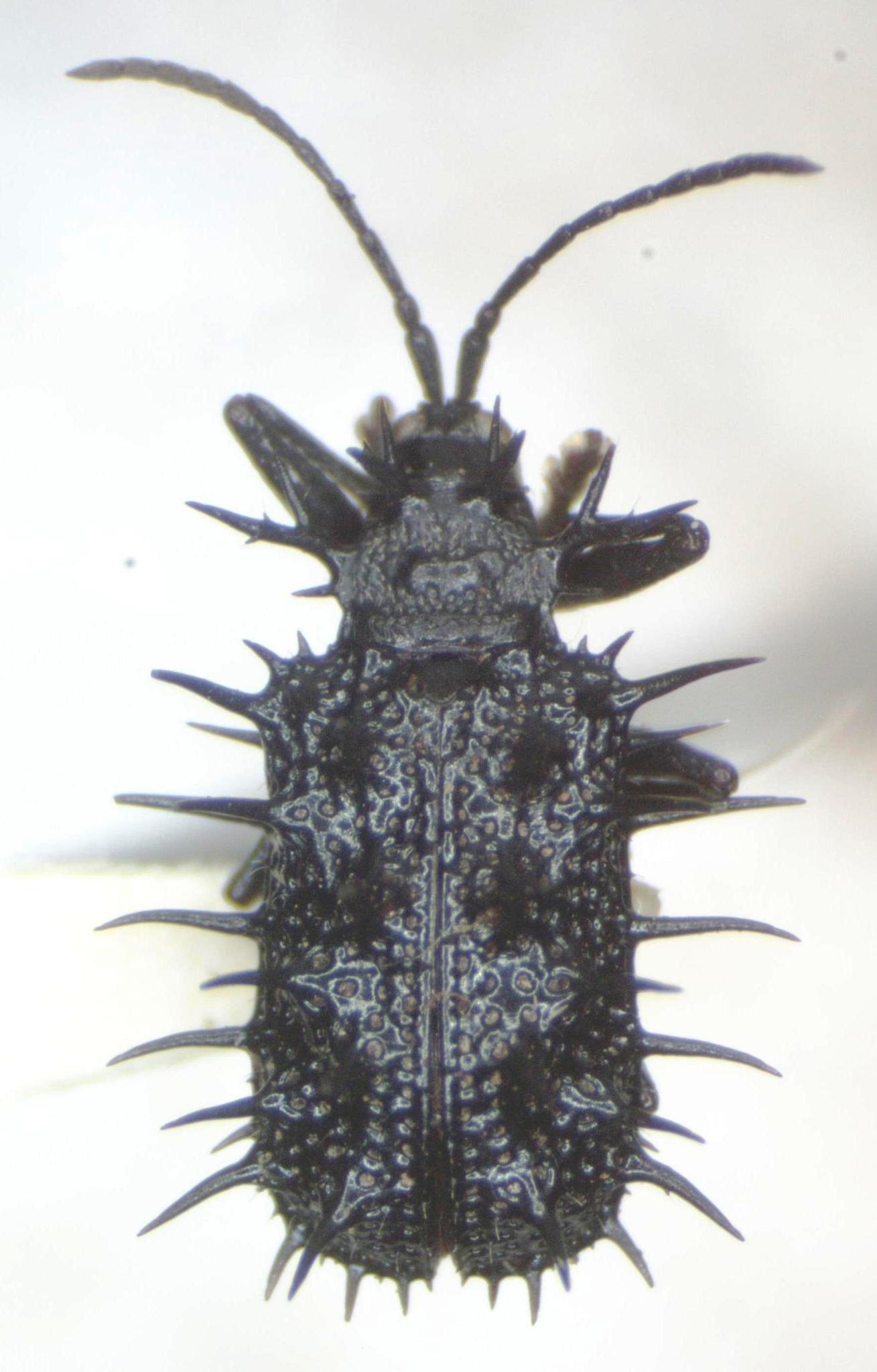
- Dactylispa spinipes, India

Scientific classification
- Kingdom: Animalia
- Phylum: Arthropoda
- Clade: Pancrustacea
- Class: Insecta
- Order: Coleoptera
- Suborder: Polyphaga
- Infraorder: Cucujiformia
- Family: Chrysomelidae
- Subfamily: Cassidinae
- Tribe: Hispini
- Genus: Dactylispa; Weise, 1897

Synonyms
- Monohispa Weise, 1897; Platyriella Chen & T'an, 1961; Podispa Chapuis, 1875; Podohispa Rye, 1877; Rhopirispa Chen & T'an, 1964; Triplispa Weise, 1897

= Dactylispa =

Genus of beetles

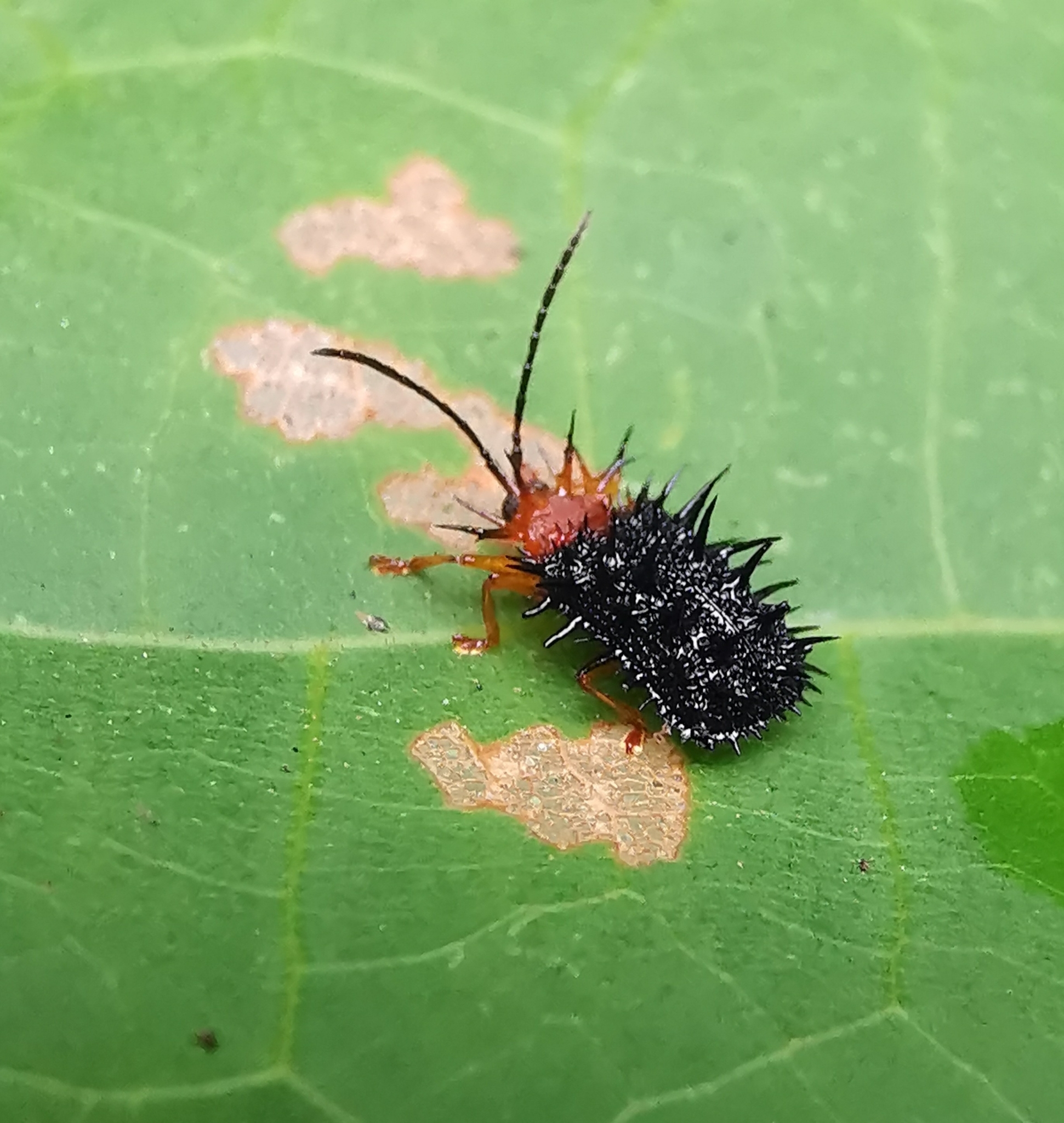
Dactylispa bipartita, Singapore

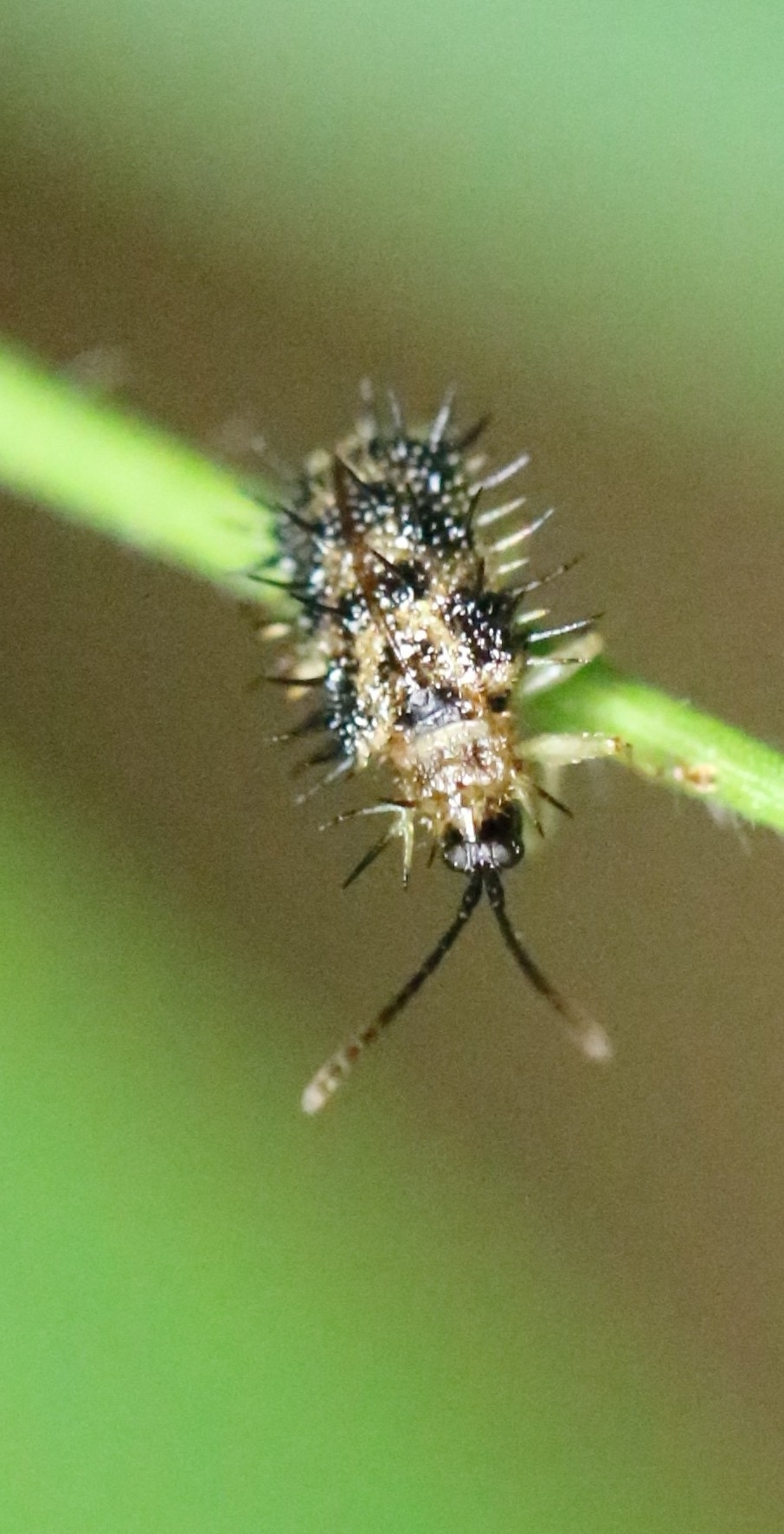
Dactylispa xanthospila, China

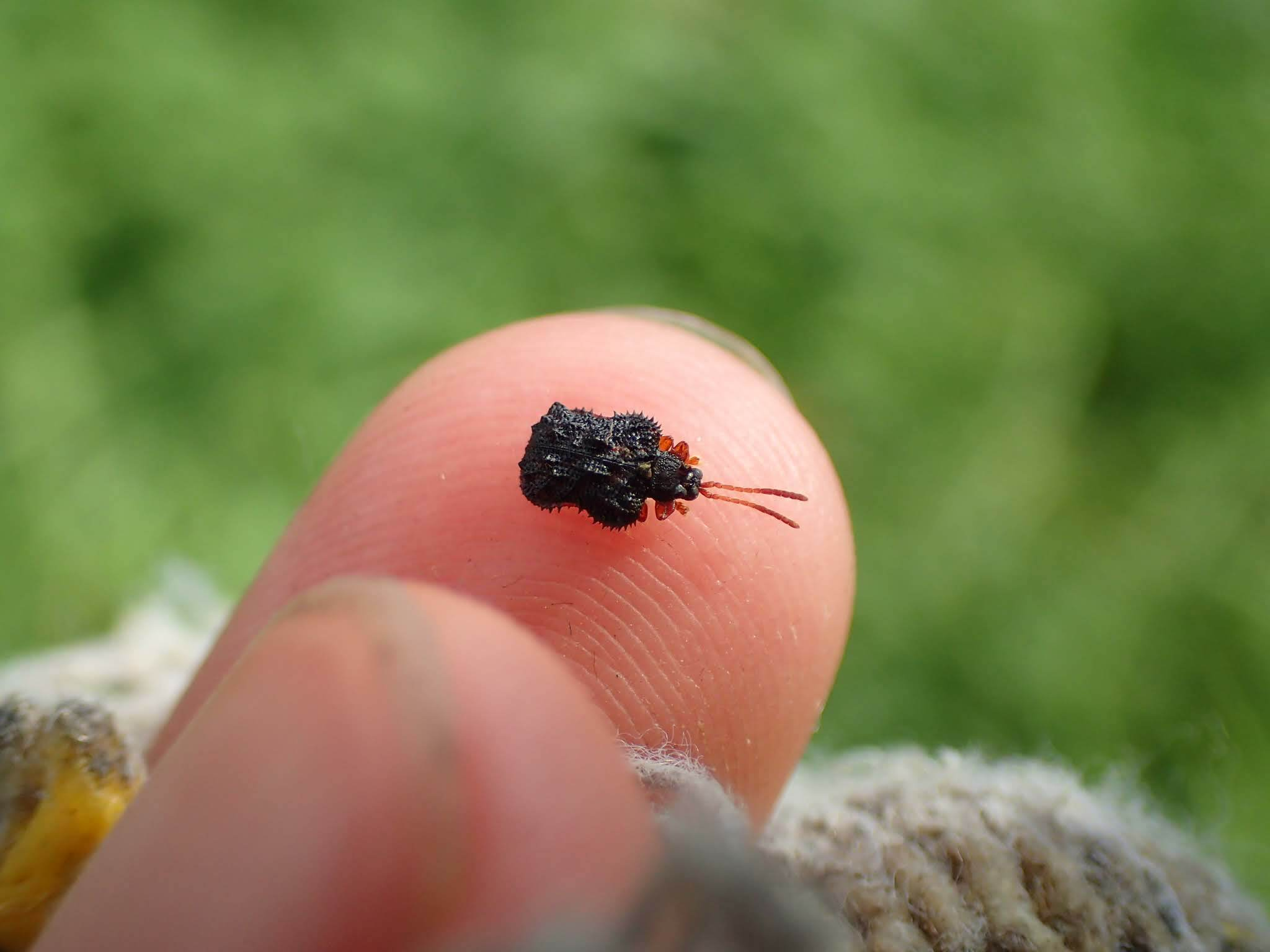
Dactylispa subquadrata, Japan

Dactylispa is a genus of leaf beetles in the tribe Hispini. There are about 370 described species in Dactylispa, found mainly in Africa and Asia.

== Species ==
These species belong to the genus Dactylispa.

1. Dactylispa abareata Uhmann, 1955 (Africa)
2. Dactylispa aculeata (Klug, 1835) (Africa)
3. Dactylispa aeneicolor (Fairmaire, 1869) (Africa)
4. Dactylispa aeneipennis (Duvivier, 1891) (Africa)
5. Dactylispa agilis Gestro, 1923 (Southern Asia)
6. Dactylispa albopilosa (Gestro, 1888) (Southern Asia)
7. Dactylispa amala Basu & Saha, 1977 (Southern Asia)
8. Dactylispa ambarum Weise, 1909 (Africa)
9. Dactylispa ambigua (Péringuey, 1898) (Africa)
10. Dactylispa andamensis Maulik, 1919 (Southern Asia)
11. Dactylispa andreaei Uhmann, 1955 (Africa)
12. Dactylispa andrewesiella Weise, 1905 (Southern Asia)
13. Dactylispa angulosa (Solsky, 1872) (Southern Asia)
14. Dactylispa angusta Gestro, 1917 (Southern Asia)
15. Dactylispa anula Maulik, 1919 (Southern Asia)
16. Dactylispa apicata (Fairmaire, 1869) (Africa)
17. Dactylispa approximata Gressitt, 1939 (Southern Asia)
18. Dactylispa argus Gestro, 1908 (Africa)
19. Dactylispa aspersa (Gestro, 1897) (Southern Asia)
20. Dactylispa atkinsonii (Gestro, 1897) (Southern Asia)
21. Dactylispa atricornis Chen & Tan, 1964 (Southern Asia)
22. Dactylispa aureopilosa Uhmann, 1931 (Africa)
23. Dactylispa badia Chen & Tan in Chen, Tan & Yu, 1961 (Southern Asia)
24. Dactylispa bakeri (Gestro, 1917) (Southern Asia)
25. Dactylispa balianii Gestro, 1909 (Africa)
26. Dactylispa basalis (Gestro, 1897) (Southern Asia)
27. Dactylispa basicornis Weise, 1909 (Africa)
28. Dactylispa bayonii Gestro, 1911 (Africa)
29. Dactylispa beccarii (Gestro, 1897) (Southern Asia)
30. Dactylispa bhaumiki Basu & Saha, 1977 (Southern Asia)
31. Dactylispa binotaticollis Chen & Tan, 1964 (Southern Asia)
32. Dactylispa bipartita (Guérin-Méneville, 1830) (Southern Asia)
33. Dactylispa bodongi Uhmann, 1930 (Africa)
34. Dactylispa brachyacantha Gestro, 1910 (Australia)
35. Dactylispa brachycera Gestro, 1914 (Africa)
36. Dactylispa brevicuspis (Gestro, 1890) (Southern Asia)
37. Dactylispa brevispina Chen & Tan, 1964 (Southern Asia)
38. Dactylispa brevispinosa (Chapuis, 1877) (Southern Asia)
39. Dactylispa breviuscula Uhmann, 1958 (Africa)
40. Dactylispa bulbifera Medvedev, 1993 (Southern Asia)
41. Dactylispa burgeoni Uhmann, 1931 (Africa)
42. Dactylispa burmana Uhmann, 1939 (Southern Asia)
43. Dactylispa calaviteana Uhmann, 1932 (Southern Asia)
44. Dactylispa callani Uhmann, 1960 (Africa)
45. Dactylispa callosa Uhmann, 1935 (Africa)
46. Dactylispa calva Uhmann, 1941 (Africa)
47. Dactylispa capicola (Péringuey, 1898) (Africa)
48. Dactylispa carinata Chen & Tan in Chen, Tan & Yu, 1961 (Southern Asia)
49. Dactylispa carinifrons Gestro, 1908 (Africa)
50. Dactylispa cauta Weise, 1899 (Africa)
51. Dactylispa cavicollis Gestro, 1906 (Africa)
52. Dactylispa celebensis Uhmann, 1960 (Southern Asia)
53. Dactylispa cervicornis Gressitt, 1950 (Southern Asia)
54. Dactylispa cervicornu Uhmann, 1931 (Africa)
55. Dactylispa ceylonica Uhmann, 1954 (Southern Asia)
56. Dactylispa chanchala Basu & Saha, 1977 (Southern Asia)
57. Dactylispa chapuisii (Gestro, 1884) (Africa)
58. Dactylispa chaturanga Maulik, 1919 (Southern Asia)
59. Dactylispa chiayiana Kimoto, 1978 (Southern Asia)
60. Dactylispa chinensis Weise, 1905
61. Dactylispa chujoi Shirozu, 1957 (Southern Asia)
62. Dactylispa cinchonae Uhmann, 1961 (Southern Asia)
63. Dactylispa cincta (Gestro, 1885) (Australia)
64. Dactylispa cladophora (Guérin-Méneville, 1841) (Southern Asia)
65. Dactylispa clavata Weise, 1902 (Africa)
66. Dactylispa clementis (Chapuis, 1877) (described as Hispa clementis from Africa, but no exact locality was stated)
67. Dactylispa collaris Uhmann, 1936 (Africa)
68. Dactylispa conferta Uhmann, 1942 (Africa)
69. Dactylispa confluens (Baly, 1889) (Southern Asia)
70. Dactylispa congrua (Péringuey, 1898) (Africa)
71. Dactylispa corpulenta Weise, 1897 (Southern Asia)
72. Dactylispa corvina Gestro, 1908 (Africa)
73. Dactylispa crassicuspis Gestro, 1908 (Southern Asia)
74. Dactylispa cribricollis Gestro, 1908 (Africa)
75. Dactylispa curvispina Uhmann, 1956 (Africa)
76. Dactylispa cylindrica Uhmann, 1958 (Africa)
77. Dactylispa daiaca Gestro, 1923 (Southern Asia)
78. Dactylispa daipa Maulik, 1919 (Southern Asia)
79. Dactylispa daturina (Gestro, 1895) (Southern Asia)
80. Dactylispa debeauxi Uhmann, 1938 (Africa)
81. Dactylispa debilis (Gestro, 1897) (Southern Asia)
82. Dactylispa delicatula (Gestro, 1888) (Southern Asia)
83. Dactylispa delkeskampi Uhmann, 1958 (Southern Asia)
84. Dactylispa dentispinis Gestro, 1908 (Africa)
85. Dactylispa desertorum Weise in Michaelsen, 1914 (Africa)
86. Dactylispa dichroa Gestro, 1908 (Africa)
87. Dactylispa digitata Uhmann, 1954 (Southern Asia)
88. Dactylispa dilutiventris Gestro, 1908 (Africa)
89. Dactylispa discalis Gressitt, 1963 (Australia)
90. Dactylispa discreta Weise, 1902 (Africa)
91. Dactylispa divarna Maulik, 1919 (Southern Asia)
92. Dactylispa dives Gestro, 1908 (Africa)
93. Dactylispa dohertyi (Gestro, 1897) (Southern Asia)
94. Dactylispa dolichocera Gestro, 1906 (Africa)
95. Dactylispa donckieri Weise, 1905 (Africa)
96. Dactylispa doriae (Gestro, 1890)
97. Dactylispa echinata (Gyllenhal in Schönherr, 1817) (Africa)
98. Dactylispa elegantula (Duvivier, 1892) (Southern Asia)
99. Dactylispa excisa (Kraatz, 1879) (Southern Asia)
100. Dactylispa exilicornis Gestro, 1908 (Africa)
101. Dactylispa fabricii Medvedev, 2009 (Southern Asia)
102. Dactylispa feae (Gestro, 1888) (Southern Asia)
103. Dactylispa femoralis Uhmann, 1954 (Africa)
104. Dactylispa ferox (Gestro, 1897) (Southern Asia)
105. Dactylispa ferrugineonigra Maulik, 1919 (Southern Asia)
106. Dactylispa filicornis (Motschulsky, 1861) (Southern Asia)
107. Dactylispa flava Achard, 1917 (Africa)
108. Dactylispa flavicornis Gestro, 1909 (Africa)
109. Dactylispa flaviventris Gestro, 1908 (Africa)
110. Dactylispa flavoapicalis Tan, 1993 (Southern Asia)
111. Dactylispa foveiscutis Chen & Tan in Chen, Tan & Yu, 1961 (Southern Asia)
112. Dactylispa fukienica Chen & Tan, 1964 (Southern Asia)
113. Dactylispa fulvicornis Weise, 1922 (Southern Asia)
114. Dactylispa fulvifrons Weise, 1909 (Africa)
115. Dactylispa fulvipes (Motschulsky in Schrenk, 1861) (Southern Asia)
116. Dactylispa fumida Chen & Tan, 1964 (Southern Asia)
117. Dactylispa furia Gestro, 1907 (Southern Asia)
118. Dactylispa gairi Maulik, 1919 (Southern Asia)
119. Dactylispa garambae Uhmann, 1961 (Africa)
120. Dactylispa gonospila (Gestro, 1897) (Southern Asia)
121. Dactylispa gracilis (Péringuey, 1898) (Africa)
122. Dactylispa gratula (Péringuey, 1898) (Africa)
123. Dactylispa gressitti Uhmann, 1955 (Southern Asia)
124. Dactylispa griveaudi Uhmann, 1964 (Africa)
125. Dactylispa haeckelii Gestro, 1902 (Southern Asia)
126. Dactylispa hamulifera Gestro, 1922 (Southern Asia)
127. Dactylispa harsha Maulik, 1919 (Southern Asia)
128. Dactylispa higoniae (Lewis, 1896) (Southern Asia)
129. Dactylispa hirsuta Gestro, 1908 (Africa)
130. Dactylispa hirtella Gestro, 1917 (Southern Asia)
131. Dactylispa horni Gestro, 1902 (Southern Asia)
132. Dactylispa horrida Gestro, 1908 (Africa)
133. Dactylispa horrifica (Gestro, 1897) (Southern Asia)
134. Dactylispa hospes Weise, 1909 (Africa)
135. Dactylispa hostica (Gestro, 1898) (Southern Asia)
136. Dactylispa humeralis Weise, 1905 (Southern Asia)
137. Dactylispa humilis Weise, 1909 (Africa)
138. Dactylispa hystrix (Duvivier, 1891) (Africa)
139. Dactylispa ignorata Uhmann, 1953 (Africa)
140. Dactylispa inaequalis Chen & Tan, 1964 (Southern Asia)
141. Dactylispa inanis (Péringuey, 1898) (Africa)
142. Dactylispa incredula Gestro, 1905
143. Dactylispa infuscata (Chapuis, 1876) (Southern Asia)
144. Dactylispa insignita (Chapuis, 1877) (Southern Asia)
145. Dactylispa intactilis (Gestro, 1897) (Southern Asia)
146. Dactylispa integra Uhmann, 1949 (Africa)
147. Dactylispa intermedia Chen & Tan in Chen, Tan & Yu, 1961 (Southern Asia)
148. Dactylispa isaroensis Uhmann, 1933 (Southern Asia)
149. Dactylispa issikii Chûjô, 1938 (Southern Asia)
150. Dactylispa jacobsoni Uhmann, 1928 (Southern Asia)
151. Dactylispa javaensis Maulik, 1931 (Southern Asia)
152. Dactylispa jiva Maulik, 1919 (Southern Asia)
153. Dactylispa jonathani Basu & Saha, 1977 (Southern Asia)
154. Dactylispa julii Uhmann, 1932 (Africa)
155. Dactylispa kambaitica Uhmann, 1939 (Southern Asia)
156. Dactylispa kantakita Maulik, 1919 (Southern Asia)
157. Dactylispa kerimii (Gestro, 1897) (Southern Asia)
158. Dactylispa klapperichi Uhmann, 1954 (Southern Asia)
159. Dactylispa kleinei Uhmann, 1930 (Southern Asia)
160. Dactylispa koreanus An et al., 1985 (Southern Asia)
161. Dactylispa kumatai Kimoto, 1996 (Southern Asia)
162. Dactylispa kunala Maulik, 1919 (Southern Asia)
163. Dactylispa laccata Uhmann, 1932 (Southern Asia)
164. Dactylispa lameyi Uhmann, 1930 (Southern Asia)
165. Dactylispa lankaja Maulik, 1919 (Southern Asia)
166. Dactylispa lateralis Weise, 1904 (Africa)
167. Dactylispa latifrons Chen & Tan in Chen, Tan & Yu, 1961 (Southern Asia)
168. Dactylispa latipennis Chûjô, 1933 (Southern Asia)
169. Dactylispa latispina (Gestro, 1899)
170. Dactylispa lenta Weise, 1902 (Africa)
171. Dactylispa lentoides Uhmann, 1931 (Africa)
172. Dactylispa leonardi (Ritsema, 1875) (Southern Asia)
173. Dactylispa leptacantha (Gestro, 1897) (Southern Asia)
174. Dactylispa lesnei Gestro, 1908 (Africa)
175. Dactylispa litigiosa (Péringuey, 1898) (Africa)
176. Dactylispa lividipes (Fairmaire, 1893) (Africa)
177. Dactylispa lohita Maulik, 1919 (Southern Asia)
178. Dactylispa longicornis (Motschulsky in Schrenk, 1861) (Southern Asia)
179. Dactylispa longicuspis (Gestro, 1897) (Southern Asia)
180. Dactylispa longispina Gressitt, 1938 (Southern Asia)
181. Dactylispa lucida Gestro, 1908 (Africa)
182. Dactylispa mabweana Uhmann, 1954 (Africa)
183. Dactylispa macnamarana Gressitt, 1957 (Australia)
184. Dactylispa maculithorax Gestro, 1906 (Southern Asia)
185. Dactylispa maculosa (Fairmaire, 1889) (Southern Asia)
186. Dactylispa madagassa Weise, 1909 (Africa)
187. Dactylispa mahendra Maulik, 1919 (Southern Asia)
188. Dactylispa major Uhmann, 1936 (Africa)
189. Dactylispa malabikae Basu & Saha, 1977 (Southern Asia)
190. Dactylispa malgachica Uhmann, 1962 (Africa)
191. Dactylispa mamillata (Chapuis, 1877) (Africa)
192. Dactylispa manni Vazirani, 1972 (Southern Asia)
193. Dactylispa manterii Gestro, 1897 (Southern Asia)
194. Dactylispa marshalli Uhmann, 1938 (Southern Asia)
195. Dactylispa mauliki Gressitt, 1950 (Southern Asia)
196. Dactylispa melanaria (Motschulsky in Schrenk, 1861) (Africa)
197. Dactylispa melanocera Chen & Tan in Chen, Tan & Yu, 1961 (Southern Asia)
198. Dactylispa melanosticta (Baly, 1890) (Southern Asia)
199. Dactylispa mendica Weise, 1897 (Southern Asia)
200. Dactylispa minax (Gestro, 1897) (Southern Asia)
201. Dactylispa minor Gressitt, 1963 (Australia)
202. Dactylispa minuta (Gestro, 1890) (Southern Asia)
203. Dactylispa miranda Gestro, 1917 (Southern Asia)
204. Dactylispa misellanea Uhmann, 1928 (Africa)
205. Dactylispa mixta Kung & Tan in Chen, Tan & Yu, 1961 (Southern Asia)
206. Dactylispa miyamotoi Kimoto, 1970 (Southern Asia)
207. Dactylispa modica Weise, 1902 (Africa)
208. Dactylispa modiglianii Gestro, 1897 (Southern Asia)
209. Dactylispa molina Basu & Saha, 1977 (Southern Asia)
210. Dactylispa montana Uhmann, 1933 (Southern Asia)
211. Dactylispa monticola (Gestro, 1890) (Southern Asia)
212. Dactylispa montivaga (Gestro, 1898) (Southern Asia)
213. Dactylispa moramangae Uhmann, 1964 (Africa)
214. Dactylispa multifida (Gestro, 1890) (Southern Asia)
215. Dactylispa nalika Maulik, 1919 (Southern Asia)
216. Dactylispa nandana Maulik, 1919 (Southern Asia)
217. Dactylispa nemoralis (Gestro, 1897) (Southern Asia)
218. Dactylispa nigricornis Gestro, 1906 (Africa)
219. Dactylispa nigripennis (Motschulsky in Schrenk, 1861) (Southern Asia)
220. Dactylispa nigritula (Guérin-Méneville, 1841) (Africa)
221. Dactylispa nigrodiscalis Gressitt, 1938 (Southern Asia)
222. Dactylispa nigromaculata (Motschulsky in Schrenk, 1861) (Southern Asia)
223. Dactylispa nitidissima Gestro, 1909 (Africa)
224. Dactylispa normalis Uhmann, 1931 (Africa)
225. Dactylispa oberthueri (Gestro, 1897) (Southern Asia)
226. Dactylispa omeia Chen & Tan in Chen, Tan & Yu, 1961 (Southern Asia)
227. Dactylispa opaca Maulik, 1919 (Southern Asia)
228. Dactylispa orchymonti Uhmann, 1931 (Africa)
229. Dactylispa orophila (Gestro, 1897) (Southern Asia)
230. Dactylispa pachycera (Gerstäcker, 1871) (Africa)
231. Dactylispa palliata (Chapuis, 1876) (Southern Asia)
232. Dactylispa pallidicollis Gressitt, 1938 (Southern Asia)
233. Dactylispa pallidipennis (Motschulsky in Schrenk, 1861) (Southern Asia)
234. Dactylispa pallidissima Gestro, 1910 (Southern Asia)
235. Dactylispa pallidiventris Gestro, 1908 (Africa)
236. Dactylispa pallipes (Kraatz, 1895) (Africa)
237. Dactylispa papilla Tan, 1993 (Southern Asia)
238. Dactylispa parbatya Maulik, 1919 (Southern Asia)
239. Dactylispa paronae (Gestro, 1890) (Southern Asia)
240. Dactylispa parva Chen & Tan in Chen, Tan & Yu, 1961 (Southern Asia)
241. Dactylispa paucispina Gressitt, 1939 (Southern Asia)
242. Dactylispa pectinata Medvedev, 1977 (Southern Asia)
243. Dactylispa perfida (Péringuey, 1898) (Africa)
244. Dactylispa perinetina Uhmann, 1960 (Africa)
245. Dactylispa perraudierei (Baly, 1889) (Southern Asia)
246. Dactylispa perrotetii (Guérin-Méneville, 1841) (Southern Asia)
247. Dactylispa pertenuis Uhmann, 1960 (Africa)
248. Dactylispa pici Uhmann, 1934 (Southern Asia)
249. Dactylispa picticornis Gestro, 1908 (Africa)
250. Dactylispa pilosa Tan & Kung in Chen, Tan & Yu, 1961 (Southern Asia)
251. Dactylispa pilosula Uhmann, 1936 (Africa)
252. Dactylispa pitapada Maulik, 1919 (Southern Asia)
253. Dactylispa plagiata Weise, 1905 (Australia)
254. Dactylispa planispina Gressitt, 1950 (Southern Asia)
255. Dactylispa platyacantha (Gestro, 1897) (Southern Asia)
256. Dactylispa platycanthoides Kimoto, 2001 (Southern Asia)
257. Dactylispa polita Chen & Tan in Chen, Tan & Yu, 1961 (Southern Asia)
258. Dactylispa postica (Gestro, 1885) (Southern Asia)
259. Dactylispa pradhana Maulik, 1919 (Southern Asia)
260. Dactylispa praefica Weise, 1897 (Southern Asia)
261. Dactylispa praegracilis Uhmann, 1956 (Southern Asia)
262. Dactylispa prasastha Maulik, 1919 (Southern Asia)
263. Dactylispa pretiosula Péringuey, 1908 (Africa)
264. Dactylispa protuberance Tan, 1982 (Southern Asia)
265. Dactylispa provida Weise, 1909 (Africa)
266. Dactylispa puberula (Chapuis, 1876) (Southern Asia)
267. Dactylispa pubescens Chen & Tan, 1962 (Southern Asia)
268. Dactylispa pubicollis (Chapuis, 1877) (Africa)
269. Dactylispa pugnax (Gestro, 1897) (Southern Asia)
270. Dactylispa puncticollis Gestro, 1906 (Africa)
271. Dactylispa pungens (Boheman, 1895) (Southern Asia)
272. Dactylispa pusilla Weise, 1905 (Southern Asia)
273. Dactylispa puwena Chen & Tan in Chen, Tan & Yu, 1961 (Southern Asia)
274. Dactylispa quinquespinosa Tan, 1982 (Southern Asia)
275. Dactylispa ramuligera (Chapuis, 1877) (Southern Asia)
276. Dactylispa redunca Gestro, 1906 (Africa)
277. Dactylispa reitteri Spaeth, 1933 (Southern Asia)
278. Dactylispa ritsemae (Chapuis, 1877) (Africa)
279. Dactylispa ruandana Uhmann, 1954 (Africa)
280. Dactylispa rubida Gestro, 1909 (Africa)
281. Dactylispa rubus (Gestro, 1892) (Australia)
282. Dactylispa rugata Gestro, 1907 (Southern Asia)
283. Dactylispa rungweae Uhmann, 1964 (Africa)
284. Dactylispa sadonensis Maulik, 1919 (Southern Asia)
285. Dactylispa sambavae Uhmann, 1964 (Africa)
286. Dactylispa sarawakensis Uhmann, 1943 (Southern Asia)
287. Dactylispa sauteri Uhmann, 1927 (Southern Asia)
288. Dactylispa schereri Würmli, 1976 (Southern Asia)
289. Dactylispa schneei Uhmann, 1928 (Africa)
290. Dactylispa schoutedeni Uhmann, 1937 (Africa)
291. Dactylispa scutellaris Chen & Tan in Chen, Tan & Yu, 1961 (Southern Asia)
292. Dactylispa secura Weise, 1922 (Africa)
293. Dactylispa semecarpi Gressitt, 1963 (Australia)
294. Dactylispa seminigra Gestro, 1908 (Southern Asia)
295. Dactylispa senegalensis Uhmann, 1956 (Africa)
296. Dactylispa sericeicollis Gestro, 1908 (Africa)
297. Dactylispa serrulata Chen & Tan, 1964 (Southern Asia)
298. Dactylispa setifera (Chapuis, 1877) (Southern Asia)
299. Dactylispa shira Basu & Saha, 1977 (Southern Asia)
300. Dactylispa sibutensis Achard, 1917 (Africa)
301. Dactylispa sicardi Weise, 1909 (Africa)
302. Dactylispa sikorae (Duvivier, 1891) (Africa)
303. Dactylispa silvana Uhmann, 1960 (Africa)
304. Dactylispa similis Chen & Tan, 1985 (Southern Asia)
305. Dactylispa sinuispina Gressitt, 1938 (Southern Asia)
306. Dactylispa sjoestedti (Uhmann, 1928) (Southern Asia)
307. Dactylispa speciosissima Gestro, 1919 (Southern Asia)
308. Dactylispa spectabilis Gestro, 1914 (Southern Asia)
309. Dactylispa spinigera (Gyllenhal in Schönherr, 1817) (Africa)
310. Dactylispa spiniloba Chen & Tan, 1964 (Southern Asia)
311. Dactylispa spinipes Weise, 1905 (Southern Asia)
312. Dactylispa spinosa (Weber, 1801) (Southern Asia)
313. Dactylispa spinulifera Uhmann, 1931 (Africa)
314. Dactylispa spinulosa (Gyllenhal in Schönherr, 1817) (Africa)
315. Dactylispa sternalis Chen & Tan, 1964 (Southern Asia)
316. Dactylispa stoetzneri Uhmann, 1955 (Southern Asia)
317. Dactylispa subcapicola Uhmann, 1962 (Africa)
318. Dactylispa subcorvina Uhmann, 1960 (Africa)
319. Dactylispa subpallipes Uhmann, 1954 (Africa)
320. Dactylispa subquadrata (Baly, 1874) (Southern Asia)
321. Dactylispa subsilvana Uhmann, 1960 (Africa)
322. Dactylispa sulcata (Chapuis, 1877) (Africa)
323. Dactylispa superspinosa Gressitt & Kimoto, 1963 (Southern Asia)
324. Dactylispa taiwana Takizawa, 1978 (Southern Asia)
325. Dactylispa tamataveae Uhmann, 1960 (Africa)
326. Dactylispa tarusama Maulik, 1919 (Southern Asia)
327. Dactylispa tebingensis Uhmann, 1930 (Southern Asia)
328. Dactylispa tenella (Péringuey, 1898) (Africa)
329. Dactylispa tenuicornis (Chapuis, 1877) (Africa)
330. Dactylispa terriculum Gestro, 1908 (Africa)
331. Dactylispa tewfiki Pic, 1939 (Africa)
332. Dactylispa tienmuensis Chen & Tan, 1964 (Southern Asia)
333. Dactylispa tientaina Chen & Tan, 1964 (Southern Asia)
334. Dactylispa tissa Maulik, 1919 (Southern Asia)
335. Dactylispa torva (Gestro, 1897) (Southern Asia)
336. Dactylispa trapa (Gestro, 1897) (Southern Asia)
337. Dactylispa tribulus (Gestro, 1897) (Southern Asia)
338. Dactylispa trigemina Uhmann, 1933 (Southern Asia)
339. Dactylispa trishula Maulik, 1919 (Southern Asia)
340. Dactylispa tristis (Duvivier, 1891) (Africa)
341. Dactylispa uhmanni Gressitt, 1954 (Southern Asia)
342. Dactylispa ungulata Uhmann, 1954 (Africa)
343. Dactylispa upembana Uhmann, 1954 (Africa)
344. Dactylispa usta Gestro, 1908 (Africa)
345. Dactylispa vanikorensis (Guérin-Méneville, 1841) (Australia)
346. Dactylispa varicornis Uhmann, 1931 (Africa)
347. Dactylispa venustula Gestro, 1908 (Africa)
348. Dactylispa verecunda Péringuey, 1908 (Africa)
349. Dactylispa vethi Gestro, 1908 (Southern Asia)
350. Dactylispa viatoris Uhmann, 1934 (Africa)
351. Dactylispa viracica Uhmann, 1932 (Southern Asia)
352. Dactylispa vittula (Chapuis, 1876) (Southern Asia)
353. Dactylispa vulgaris (Gestro, 1897) (Southern Asia)
354. Dactylispa vulnifica Gestro, 1908 (Southern Asia)
355. Dactylispa weyersi (Gestro, 1899) (Southern Asia)
356. Dactylispa wissmanni Uhmann, 1928 (Africa)
357. Dactylispa wittei Uhmann, 1941 (Africa)
358. Dactylispa wittmeri Würmli, 1975 (Southern Asia)
359. Dactylispa xanthogastra Gestro, 1908 (Africa)
360. Dactylispa xanthopus (Gestro, 1898) (Southern Asia)
361. Dactylispa xisana Chen & Tan in Chen, Tan & Yu, 1961 (Southern Asia)
362. Dactylispa zulu (Péringuey, 1898) (Africa)
363. Dactylispa zumpti Uhmann, 1940 (Africa)

== Selected former species ==
1. Dactylispa arisana Chûjô, 1933 (Southern Asia)
2. Dactylispa assamensis Weise, 1904
3. Dactylispa asoka Maulik, 1919 (Southern Asia)
4. Dactylispa balyi (Gestro, 1890) (Southern Asia)
5. Dactylispa clavicornis Chen & Tan, 1964 (Southern Asia)
6. Dactylispa dorchymonti Uhmann, 1931 (Africa)
7. Dactylispa insulicola Chûjô, 1933 (Southern Asia)
8. Dactylispa krishna Maulik, 1919 (Southern Asia)
9. Dactylispa perpusilla Gestro, 1911 (Africa)
10. Dactylispa piceomaculata Gressitt, 1939 (Southern Asia)
11. Dactylispa rufescens Shirozu, 1957 (Southern Asia)
12. Dactylispa severinii (Gestro, 1897) (Southern Asia)
13. Dactylispa singularis (Gestro, 1888) (Southern Asia)
14. Dactylispa tuberculata (Gressitt, 1950) (Southern Asia)
