= Dactylispa aeneicolor =

Scientific classification
- Kingdom: Animalia
- Phylum: Arthropoda
- Class: Insecta
- Order: Coleoptera
- Suborder: Polyphaga
- Infraorder: Cucujiformia
- Family: Chrysomelidae
- Genus: Dactylispa
- Species: D. aeneicolor

Binomial name
- Dactylispa aeneicolor (Fairmaire, 1869)

Synonyms
- Hispa aeneicolor Fairmaire, 1869

Species of beetle

Dactylispa aeneicolor is a species of beetle of the family Chrysomelidae. It is found in Madagascar.

== Life history ==
No host plant has been documented for this species.
