= Dactylispa apicata =

Scientific classification
- Kingdom: Animalia
- Phylum: Arthropoda
- Class: Insecta
- Order: Coleoptera
- Suborder: Polyphaga
- Infraorder: Cucujiformia
- Family: Chrysomelidae
- Genus: Dactylispa
- Species: D. apicata

Binomial name
- Dactylispa apicata (Fairmaire, 1869)

Synonyms
- Hispa apicata Fairmaire, 1869

Species of beetle

Dactylispa apicata is a species of beetle of the family Chrysomelidae. It is found in Madagascar.

== Life history ==
No host plant has been documented for this species.
