= Dactylispa cylindrica =

Scientific classification
- Kingdom: Animalia
- Phylum: Arthropoda
- Class: Insecta
- Order: Coleoptera
- Suborder: Polyphaga
- Infraorder: Cucujiformia
- Family: Chrysomelidae
- Genus: Dactylispa
- Species: D. cylindrica

Binomial name
- Dactylispa cylindrica Uhmann, 1958

Species of beetle

Dactylispa cylindrica is a species of beetle of the family Chrysomelidae. It is found in South Africa.

== Life history ==
The host plant for this species is Croton subgratissimus.
