= Dactylispa mendica =

Scientific classification
- Kingdom: Animalia
- Phylum: Arthropoda
- Class: Insecta
- Order: Coleoptera
- Suborder: Polyphaga
- Infraorder: Cucujiformia
- Family: Chrysomelidae
- Genus: Dactylispa
- Species: D. mendica

Binomial name
- Dactylispa mendica Weise, 1897

Species of beetle

Dactylispa mendica is a species of beetle of the family Chrysomelidae. It is found in Cambodia, China (Yunnan), Myanmar, Thailand and Vietnam.

== Life history ==
No host plant has been documented for this species.
