= Dactylispa orchymonti =

Scientific classification
- Kingdom: Animalia
- Phylum: Arthropoda
- Class: Insecta
- Order: Coleoptera
- Suborder: Polyphaga
- Infraorder: Cucujiformia
- Family: Chrysomelidae
- Genus: Dactylispa
- Species: D. orchymonti

Binomial name
- Dactylispa orchymonti Uhmann, 1931

Synonyms
- Dactylispa d'orchymonti Uhmann, 1931

Species of beetle

Dactylispa orchymonti is a species of beetle of the family Chrysomelidae. It is found in Cameroon, Congo, Equatorial Guinea, Guinea, Ivory Coast and Nigeria.

== Life history ==
The recorded host plant for this species is Theobroma cacao.
