= Dactylispa pici =

Scientific classification
- Kingdom: Animalia
- Phylum: Arthropoda
- Class: Insecta
- Order: Coleoptera
- Suborder: Polyphaga
- Infraorder: Cucujiformia
- Family: Chrysomelidae
- Genus: Dactylispa
- Species: D. pici

Binomial name
- Dactylispa pici Uhmann, 1934

Synonyms
- Dactylispa marginicollis Gressitt, 1939; Dactylispa marginicollis borealis L. Medvedev, 1973

Species of beetle

Dactylispa pici is a species of beetle of the family Chrysomelidae. It is found in China (Fujian, Guangdong, Jiangxi, Yunnan), Russia and Vietnam.

== Life history ==
No host plant has been documented for this species.
