= Dactylispa zulu =

Scientific classification
- Kingdom: Animalia
- Phylum: Arthropoda
- Class: Insecta
- Order: Coleoptera
- Suborder: Polyphaga
- Infraorder: Cucujiformia
- Family: Chrysomelidae
- Genus: Dactylispa
- Species: D. zulu

Binomial name
- Dactylispa zulu (Péringuey, 1898)

Synonyms
- Hispa zulu Péringuey, 1898; Dactylispa zuluensis Weise, 1901

Species of beetle

Dactylispa zulu is a species of beetle of the family Chrysomelidae. It is found in Mozambique and South Africa.

== Life history ==
No host plant has been documented for this species.
