= Dactylispa pubescens =

Scientific classification
- Kingdom: Animalia
- Phylum: Arthropoda
- Class: Insecta
- Order: Coleoptera
- Suborder: Polyphaga
- Infraorder: Cucujiformia
- Family: Chrysomelidae
- Genus: Dactylispa
- Species: D. pubescens

Binomial name
- Dactylispa pubescens Chen & T’an, 1962

Synonyms
- Dactylispa aureopilosa Chen & T’an, 1961 (preocc.)

Species of beetle

Dactylispa pubescens is a species of beetle of the family Chrysomelidae. It is found in China (Yunnan).

== Life history ==
No host plant has been documented for this species.
