= Dactylispa discreta =

Scientific classification
- Kingdom: Animalia
- Phylum: Arthropoda
- Class: Insecta
- Order: Coleoptera
- Suborder: Polyphaga
- Infraorder: Cucujiformia
- Family: Chrysomelidae
- Genus: Dactylispa
- Species: D. discreta

Binomial name
- Dactylispa discreta Weise, 1901

Species of beetle

Dactylispa discreta is a species of beetle of the family Chrysomelidae. It is found in Congo, Equatorial Guinea, Kenya, Mozambique, South Africa and Tanzania.

== Life history ==
No host plant has been documented for this species.
