= Dactylispa vanikorensis =

Scientific classification
- Kingdom: Animalia
- Phylum: Arthropoda
- Class: Insecta
- Order: Coleoptera
- Suborder: Polyphaga
- Infraorder: Cucujiformia
- Family: Chrysomelidae
- Genus: Dactylispa
- Species: D. vanikorensis

Binomial name
- Dactylispa vanikorensis (Guérin-Méneville, 1841)

Synonyms
- Hispa vanikorensis Guérin-Méneville, 1841

Species of beetle

Dactylispa vanikorensis is a species of beetle of the family Chrysomelidae. It is found on Santa Cruz Island.

== Life history ==
No host plant has been documented for this species.
