= Dactylispa sibutensis =

Scientific classification
- Kingdom: Animalia
- Phylum: Arthropoda
- Class: Insecta
- Order: Coleoptera
- Suborder: Polyphaga
- Infraorder: Cucujiformia
- Family: Chrysomelidae
- Genus: Dactylispa
- Species: D. sibutensis

Binomial name
- Dactylispa sibutensis Achard, 1917

Synonyms
- Dactylispa valida Uhmann, 1931

Species of beetle

Dactylispa sibutensis is a species of beetle of the family Chrysomelidae. It is found in Cameroon, Congo, Equatorial Guinea and Nigeria.

== Life history ==
No host plant has been documented for this species.
