= Anisodera elongata =

Scientific classification
- Kingdom: Animalia
- Phylum: Arthropoda
- Clade: Pancrustacea
- Class: Insecta
- Order: Coleoptera
- Suborder: Polyphaga
- Infraorder: Cucujiformia
- Family: Chrysomelidae
- Genus: Anisodera
- Species: A. elongata

Binomial name
- Anisodera elongata Gestro, 1885

Species of beetle

Anisodera elongata is a species of beetle of the family Chrysomelidae. It is found in Indonesia (Java, Sumatra) and Malaysia.

== Biology ==
They have been recorded feeding on Musa species.
