= Dactylispa bayonii =

Scientific classification
- Kingdom: Animalia
- Phylum: Arthropoda
- Class: Insecta
- Order: Coleoptera
- Suborder: Polyphaga
- Infraorder: Cucujiformia
- Family: Chrysomelidae
- Genus: Dactylispa
- Species: D. bayonii

Binomial name
- Dactylispa bayonii Gestro, 1911

Species of beetle

Dactylispa bayonii is a species of beetle of the family Chrysomelidae. It is found in Kenya, Rwanda and Uganda.

== Life history ==
The recorded host plant for this species is Oryza sativa.
