= Coelaenomenodera speciosa =

Scientific classification
- Kingdom: Animalia
- Phylum: Arthropoda
- Clade: Pancrustacea
- Class: Insecta
- Order: Coleoptera
- Suborder: Polyphaga
- Infraorder: Cucujiformia
- Family: Chrysomelidae
- Genus: Coelaenomenodera
- Species: C. speciosa

Binomial name
- Coelaenomenodera speciosa Gestro, 1905

Species of beetle

Coelaenomenodera speciosa is a species of beetle of the family Chrysomelidae. It is found in Cameroon, Congo and Nigeria.

== Biology ==
The recorded food plant is Elaeis guineensis.
