= Dactylispa puncticollis =

Scientific classification
- Kingdom: Animalia
- Phylum: Arthropoda
- Class: Insecta
- Order: Coleoptera
- Suborder: Polyphaga
- Infraorder: Cucujiformia
- Family: Chrysomelidae
- Genus: Dactylispa
- Species: D. puncticollis

Binomial name
- Dactylispa puncticollis Gestro, 1906

Species of beetle

Dactylispa puncticollis is a species of beetle of the family Chrysomelidae. It is found in Congo, Equatorial Guinea, Guinea, Ivory Coast, Nigeria and South Africa.

== Life history ==
The recorded host plant for this species is Theobroma cacao.
