= Dactylispa vethi =

Scientific classification
- Kingdom: Animalia
- Phylum: Arthropoda
- Clade: Pancrustacea
- Class: Insecta
- Order: Coleoptera
- Suborder: Polyphaga
- Infraorder: Cucujiformia
- Family: Chrysomelidae
- Genus: Dactylispa
- Species: D. vethi

Binomial name
- Dactylispa vethi Gestro, 1908

Species of beetle

Dactylispa vethi is a species of beetle of the family Chrysomelidae. It is found in Indonesia (Java, Sumatra).

== Life history ==
The recorded host plant for this species is Plectronia horrida.
