= Wallacea raapii =

Scientific classification
- Kingdom: Animalia
- Phylum: Arthropoda
- Clade: Pancrustacea
- Class: Insecta
- Order: Coleoptera
- Suborder: Polyphaga
- Infraorder: Cucujiformia
- Family: Chrysomelidae
- Genus: Wallacea
- Species: W. raapii

Binomial name
- Wallacea raapii Gestro, 1898

Synonyms
- Pistosia raapii

Species of beetle

Wallacea raapii is a species of beetle in the family Chrysomelidae. It is found in Indonesia (Nias).
