= Dactylispa dohertyi =

Scientific classification
- Kingdom: Animalia
- Phylum: Arthropoda
- Class: Insecta
- Order: Coleoptera
- Suborder: Polyphaga
- Infraorder: Cucujiformia
- Family: Chrysomelidae
- Genus: Dactylispa
- Species: D. dohertyi

Binomial name
- Dactylispa dohertyi (Gestro, 1897)

Synonyms
- Hispa dohertyi Gestro, 1897

Species of beetle

Dactylispa dohertyi is a species of beetle of the family Chrysomelidae. It is found in China (Yunnan), India and Myanmar.

== Life history ==
The recorded host plant for this species is Malus domestica.
