= Anisodera sculpticollis =

Scientific classification
- Kingdom: Animalia
- Phylum: Arthropoda
- Class: Insecta
- Order: Coleoptera
- Suborder: Polyphaga
- Infraorder: Cucujiformia
- Family: Chrysomelidae
- Genus: Anisodera
- Species: A. sculpticollis

Binomial name
- Anisodera sculpticollis Gestro, 1909

Species of beetle

Anisodera sculpticollis is a species of beetle of the family Chrysomelidae. It is found in Indonesia (Borneo) and Malaysia.
