= Anisodera testacea =

Scientific classification
- Kingdom: Animalia
- Phylum: Arthropoda
- Clade: Pancrustacea
- Class: Insecta
- Order: Coleoptera
- Suborder: Polyphaga
- Infraorder: Cucujiformia
- Family: Chrysomelidae
- Genus: Anisodera
- Species: A. testacea

Binomial name
- Anisodera testacea Gestro, 1897

Species of beetle

Anisodera testacea is a species of beetle in the family Chrysomelidae. It is found in Indonesia (Borneo, Sumatra) and Malaysia.
