= Wallacea vittata =

Scientific classification
- Kingdom: Animalia
- Phylum: Arthropoda
- Clade: Pancrustacea
- Class: Insecta
- Order: Coleoptera
- Suborder: Polyphaga
- Infraorder: Cucujiformia
- Family: Chrysomelidae
- Genus: Wallacea
- Species: W. vittata

Binomial name
- Wallacea vittata Gestro, 1919

Synonyms
- Pistosia vittata

Species of beetle

Wallacea vittata is a species of beetle in the family Chrysomelidae. It is found in the Philippines (Luzon).
