= Wallacea terminalis =

Scientific classification
- Kingdom: Animalia
- Phylum: Arthropoda
- Clade: Pancrustacea
- Class: Insecta
- Order: Coleoptera
- Suborder: Polyphaga
- Infraorder: Cucujiformia
- Family: Chrysomelidae
- Genus: Wallacea
- Species: W. terminalis

Binomial name
- Wallacea terminalis Gestro, 1917

Synonyms
- Pistosia terminalis

Species of beetle

Wallacea terminalis is a species of beetle in the family Chrysomelidae. It is found in the Philippines (Tabayas).
