= Dactylispa spectabilis =

Scientific classification
- Kingdom: Animalia
- Phylum: Arthropoda
- Class: Insecta
- Order: Coleoptera
- Suborder: Polyphaga
- Infraorder: Cucujiformia
- Family: Chrysomelidae
- Genus: Dactylispa
- Species: D. spectabilis

Binomial name
- Dactylispa spectabilis Gestro, 1914

Species of beetle

Dactylispa spectabilis is a species of beetle of the family Chrysomelidae. It is found in China (Hubei, Jiangxi, Yunnan).

== Life history ==
The recorded host plants for this species are Celastraceae species.
