= Dactylispa miranda =

Scientific classification
- Kingdom: Animalia
- Phylum: Arthropoda
- Class: Insecta
- Order: Coleoptera
- Suborder: Polyphaga
- Infraorder: Cucujiformia
- Family: Chrysomelidae
- Genus: Dactylispa
- Species: D. miranda

Binomial name
- Dactylispa miranda Gestro, 1917

Synonyms
- Dactylispa miranda unicolor Uhmann, 1964

Species of beetle

Dactylispa miranda is a species of beetle of the family Chrysomelidae. It is found in the Philippines (Bucas, Leyte, Luzon, Mindanao, Negros, Samar).

== Life history ==
No host plant has been documented for this species.
