= Anisodera fallax =

Scientific classification
- Kingdom: Animalia
- Phylum: Arthropoda
- Class: Insecta
- Order: Coleoptera
- Suborder: Polyphaga
- Infraorder: Cucujiformia
- Family: Chrysomelidae
- Genus: Anisodera
- Species: A. fallax

Binomial name
- Anisodera fallax Gestro, 1899

Species of beetle

Anisodera fallax is a species of beetle of the family Chrysomelidae. It is found in Indonesia (Sumatra).
