= Dactylispa brachycera =

Scientific classification
- Kingdom: Animalia
- Phylum: Arthropoda
- Class: Insecta
- Order: Coleoptera
- Suborder: Polyphaga
- Infraorder: Cucujiformia
- Family: Chrysomelidae
- Genus: Dactylispa
- Species: D. brachycera

Binomial name
- Dactylispa brachycera Gestro, 1914

Species of beetle

Dactylispa brachycera is a species of beetle of the family Chrysomelidae. It is found in Kenya.

No host plant has been documented for this species.
