= Anisodera tuberosa =

Scientific classification
- Kingdom: Animalia
- Phylum: Arthropoda
- Class: Insecta
- Order: Coleoptera
- Suborder: Polyphaga
- Infraorder: Cucujiformia
- Family: Chrysomelidae
- Genus: Anisodera
- Species: A. = tuberosa

Binomial name
- Anisodera = tuberosa Gestro, 1897

Species of beetle

Anisodera tuberosa is a species of beetle of the family Chrysomelidae. It is found in Indonesia (Sumatra) and Malaysia.
