= Dactylispa monticola =

Scientific classification
- Kingdom: Animalia
- Phylum: Arthropoda
- Class: Insecta
- Order: Coleoptera
- Suborder: Polyphaga
- Infraorder: Cucujiformia
- Family: Chrysomelidae
- Genus: Dactylispa
- Species: D. monticola

Binomial name
- Dactylispa monticola (Gestro, 1890)

Synonyms
- Hispa monticola Gestro, 1890; Hispa monticola anthracina Gestro, 1890

Species of beetle

Dactylispa monticola is a species of beetle of the family Chrysomelidae. It is found in Myanmar.

== Life history ==
No host plant has been documented for this species.
