= Wallacea marginata =

Scientific classification
- Kingdom: Animalia
- Phylum: Arthropoda
- Clade: Pancrustacea
- Class: Insecta
- Order: Coleoptera
- Suborder: Polyphaga
- Infraorder: Cucujiformia
- Family: Chrysomelidae
- Genus: Wallacea
- Species: W. marginata

Binomial name
- Wallacea marginata Gestro, 1896

Synonyms
- Wallaceana marginata; Pistosia marginata

Species of beetle

Wallacea marginata is a species of beetle in the family Chrysomelidae. It is found in Indonesia (Java, Mentawai).

== Biology ==
They have been recorded feeding on Plectocomia species.
