= Wallacea inornata =

Scientific classification
- Kingdom: Animalia
- Phylum: Arthropoda
- Clade: Pancrustacea
- Class: Insecta
- Order: Coleoptera
- Suborder: Polyphaga
- Infraorder: Cucujiformia
- Family: Chrysomelidae
- Genus: Wallacea
- Species: W. inornata

Binomial name
- Wallacea inornata Gestro, 1892

Synonyms
- Pistosia inornata

Species of beetle

Wallacea inornata is a species of beetle in the family Chrysomelidae. It is found in Indonesia (Enggano, Java, Sumatra) and Malaysia.

== Biology ==
They have been recorded feeding on Calamus ornatus, Eugeissona tristis, Iguanura wallichiana, Oncosperma horridum and Salacca species.
