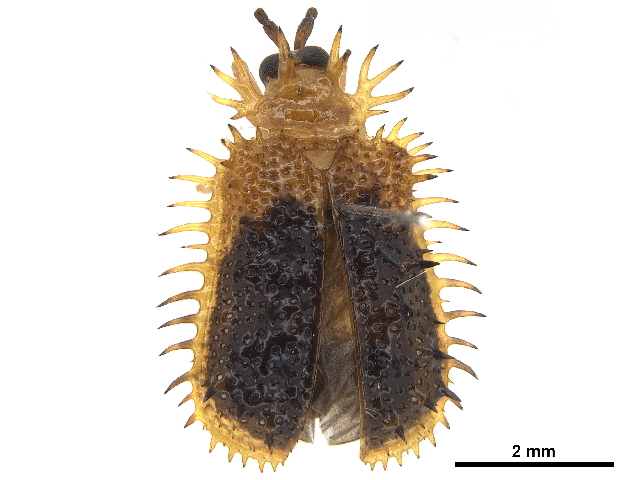

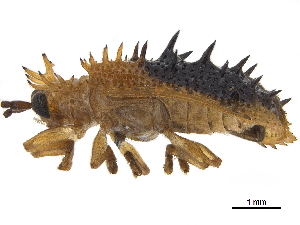

Scientific classification
- Kingdom: Animalia
- Phylum: Arthropoda
- Class: Insecta
- Order: Coleoptera
- Suborder: Polyphaga
- Infraorder: Cucujiformia
- Family: Chrysomelidae
- Genus: Dactylispa
- Species: D. rubus

Binomial name
- Dactylispa rubus (Gestro, 1892)

Synonyms
- Hispa rubus Gestro, 1892

= Dactylispa rubus =

Species of beetle

Dactylispa rubus is a species of beetle of the family Chrysomelidae. It is found in New Guinea and on the Solomon Islands (Guadalcanal).

== Life history ==
No host plant has been documented for this species.
