= Wallacea bakeri =

Scientific classification
- Kingdom: Animalia
- Phylum: Arthropoda
- Clade: Pancrustacea
- Class: Insecta
- Order: Coleoptera
- Suborder: Polyphaga
- Infraorder: Cucujiformia
- Family: Chrysomelidae
- Genus: Wallacea
- Species: W. bakeri

Binomial name
- Wallacea bakeri Gestro, 1919

Synonyms
- Pistosia bakeri

Species of beetle

Wallacea bakeri is a species of beetle of the family Chrysomelidae. It is found in Singapore.
