= Wallacea conspicua =

Scientific classification
- Kingdom: Animalia
- Phylum: Arthropoda
- Clade: Pancrustacea
- Class: Insecta
- Order: Coleoptera
- Suborder: Polyphaga
- Infraorder: Cucujiformia
- Family: Chrysomelidae
- Genus: Wallacea
- Species: W. conspicua

Binomial name
- Wallacea conspicua Gestro, 1899

Synonyms
- Pistosia conspicua

Species of beetle

Wallacea conspicua is a species of beetle in the family Chrysomelidae. It is found in Indonesia (Sumatra).
