= Wallacea neglecta =

Scientific classification
- Kingdom: Animalia
- Phylum: Arthropoda
- Clade: Pancrustacea
- Class: Insecta
- Order: Coleoptera
- Suborder: Polyphaga
- Infraorder: Cucujiformia
- Family: Chrysomelidae
- Genus: Wallacea
- Species: W. neglecta

Binomial name
- Wallacea neglecta Gestro, 1903

Synonyms
- Wallaceana neglecta; Pistosia neglecta

Species of beetle

Wallacea neglecta is a species of beetle in the family Chrysomelidae. It is found in Malaysia (Sarawak).
