= Dactylispa latispina =

Scientific classification
- Kingdom: Animalia
- Phylum: Arthropoda
- Class: Insecta
- Order: Coleoptera
- Suborder: Polyphaga
- Infraorder: Cucujiformia
- Family: Chrysomelidae
- Genus: Dactylispa
- Species: D. latispina

Binomial name
- Dactylispa latispina (Gestro, 1899)

Synonyms
- Hispa latispina Gestro, 1899; Dactylispa saurus Uhmann, 1954

Species of beetle

Dactylispa latispina is a species of beetle of the family Chrysomelidae. It is found in China (Fujian) and Vietnam.

== Life history ==
No host plant has been documented for this species.
