= Wallacea limbata =

Scientific classification
- Kingdom: Animalia
- Phylum: Arthropoda
- Clade: Pancrustacea
- Class: Insecta
- Order: Coleoptera
- Suborder: Polyphaga
- Infraorder: Cucujiformia
- Family: Chrysomelidae
- Genus: Wallacea
- Species: W. limbata

Binomial name
- Wallacea limbata Gestro, 1906

Synonyms
- Wallaceana limbata

Species of beetle

Wallacea limbata is a species of beetle in the family Chrysomelidae. It is found in India (Tamil Nadu).

== Biology ==
They have been recorded feeding on Arecaceae species.
