= Wallacea apicalis =

Scientific classification
- Kingdom: Animalia
- Phylum: Arthropoda
- Clade: Pancrustacea
- Class: Insecta
- Order: Coleoptera
- Suborder: Polyphaga
- Infraorder: Cucujiformia
- Family: Chrysomelidae
- Genus: Wallacea
- Species: W. apicalis

Binomial name
- Wallacea apicalis Gestro, 1896

Synonyms
- Wallacea palmarum Gestro, 1913

Species of beetle

Wallacea apicalis is a species of beetle of the family Chrysomelidae. It is found in Indonesia (Java, Lombok, Mentawai, Sumatra, Sumba), Malaysia, Singapore and Sri Lanka.

== Biology ==
They have been recorded feeding on Areca triandra, Cocos nucifera, Areca catechu, Metroxylon species (including Metroxylon sagu), Nipa fruticans, Eugeissona tristis, and Phoenix roebelenii.
