= Dactylispa brevicuspis =

Scientific classification
- Kingdom: Animalia
- Phylum: Arthropoda
- Class: Insecta
- Order: Coleoptera
- Suborder: Polyphaga
- Infraorder: Cucujiformia
- Family: Chrysomelidae
- Genus: Dactylispa
- Species: D. brevicuspis

Binomial name
- Dactylispa brevicuspis (Gestro, 1890)

Synonyms
- Hispa brevicuspis Gestro, 1890

Species of beetle

Dactylispa brevicuspis is a species of beetle of the family Chrysomelidae. It is found in Myanmar.

No host plant has been documented for this species.
