= Dactylispa platyacantha =

Scientific classification
- Kingdom: Animalia
- Phylum: Arthropoda
- Class: Insecta
- Order: Coleoptera
- Suborder: Polyphaga
- Infraorder: Cucujiformia
- Family: Chrysomelidae
- Genus: Dactylispa
- Species: D. platyacantha

Binomial name
- Dactylispa platyacantha (Gestro, 1897)

Synonyms
- Hispa platyacantha Gestro, 1897

Species of beetle

Dactylispa platyacantha is a species of beetle of the family Chrysomelidae. It is found in China (Fujian, Guangdong, Guangxi, Hainan, Hunan, Jiangxi, Yunnan), Laos, Myanmar, Nepal and Thailand.

== Life history ==
No host plant has been documented for this species.
