= Anisodera densa =

Scientific classification
- Kingdom: Animalia
- Phylum: Arthropoda
- Class: Insecta
- Order: Coleoptera
- Suborder: Polyphaga
- Infraorder: Cucujiformia
- Family: Chrysomelidae
- Genus: Anisodera
- Species: A. densa

Binomial name
- Anisodera densa Uhmann, 1937

Species of beetle

Anisodera densa is a species of beetle of the family Chrysomelidae. It is found in the Philippines (Ducas, Luzon, Mindanao).
