= Coelaenomenodera =

- Coelaenomenodera tristicula

Scientific classification
- Kingdom: Animalia
- Phylum: Arthropoda
- Class: Insecta
- Order: Coleoptera
- Suborder: Polyphaga
- Infraorder: Cucujiformia
- Family: Chrysomelidae
- Subfamily: Cassidinae
- Tribe: Coelaenomenoderini
- Genus: Coelaenomenodera; Blanchard, 1845

Synonyms
- Diplocoeloma Thomson, 1858

Genus of leaf beetles

Coelaenomenodera is a genus of beetles belonging to the family Chrysomelidae; species are found in Africa, with many in Madagascar.

== Species ==
- Subgenus Coelaenomenodera
  - Coelaenomenodera abnormis Fairmaire, 1897
  - Coelaenomenodera angustata Pic, 1932
  - Coelaenomenodera bicavata Fairmaire, 1897
  - Coelaenomenodera campestris Fairmaire, 1887
  - Coelaenomenodera chermesina Fairmaire, 1897
  - Coelaenomenodera coccinea Fairmaire, 1890
  - Coelaenomenodera collarti Uhmann, 1936
  - Coelaenomenodera coquerelii Fairmaire, 1869
  - Coelaenomenodera costulata Kolbe in Stuhlmann, 1897
  - Coelaenomenodera crassicornis Fairmaire, 1897
  - Coelaenomenodera cucullata (Guérin-Méneville in Cuvier, 1844)
  - Coelaenomenodera distinguenda Fairmaire, 1897
  - Coelaenomenodera donckieri Weise, 1922
  - Coelaenomenodera elaeidis Maulik, 1920
  - Coelaenomenodera elegantula Gestro, 1908
  - Coelaenomenodera femorata Fairmaire, 1890
  - Coelaenomenodera funerea Weise, 1922
  - Coelaenomenodera heterocera Gestro, 1908
  - Coelaenomenodera lameensis Berti and Mariau, 2000
  - Coelaenomenodera leroyi Fairmaire, 1880
  - Coelaenomenodera lesnei Gestro, 1908
  - Coelaenomenodera luctuosa Fairmaire, 1897
  - Coelaenomenodera luridicollis Fairmaire, 1897
  - Coelaenomenodera nigricollis Pic, 1953
  - Coelaenomenodera nigripes Weise, 1911
  - Coelaenomenodera octofoveolata Uhmann, 1930
  - Coelaenomenodera pallescens Gestro, 1908
  - Coelaenomenodera perrieri Fairmaire, 1898
  - Coelaenomenodera praeusta (Guérin-Méneville in Cuvier, 1844)
  - Coelaenomenodera pulchella (Coquerel, 1852)
  - Coelaenomenodera pusilla Gestro, 1908
  - Coelaenomenodera signifera Gestro, 1905
  - Coelaenomenodera simplicicollis Gestro, 1908
  - Coelaenomenodera speciosa Gestro, 1905
  - Coelaenomenodera straminipennis Weise, 1922
  - Coelaenomenodera suturalis (Guérin-Méneville in Cuvier, 1844)
  - Coelaenomenodera tarsata Baly, 1858
  - Coelaenomenodera thomsoni Gestro, 1909
  - Coelaenomenodera tristicula Fairmaire, 1890
  - Coelaenomenodera tuberculata Gestro, 1908
- Subgenus Anomalispa Gestro, 1909
  - Coelaenomenodera crioceriformis Gestro, 1908
  - Coelaenomenodera gestroi (Achard, 1915)
