= Anisodera bowringii =

Scientific classification
- Kingdom: Animalia
- Phylum: Arthropoda
- Clade: Pancrustacea
- Class: Insecta
- Order: Coleoptera
- Suborder: Polyphaga
- Infraorder: Cucujiformia
- Family: Chrysomelidae
- Genus: Anisodera
- Species: A. bowringii

Binomial name
- Anisodera bowringii Baly, 1858

Species of beetle

Anisodera bowringii is a species of beetle of the family Chrysomelidae. It is found in Malaysia and Indonesia (Java).
