= Coelaenomenodera gestroi =

Scientific classification
- Kingdom: Animalia
- Phylum: Arthropoda
- Clade: Pancrustacea
- Class: Insecta
- Order: Coleoptera
- Suborder: Polyphaga
- Infraorder: Cucujiformia
- Family: Chrysomelidae
- Genus: Coelaenomenodera
- Species: C. gestroi

Binomial name
- Coelaenomenodera gestroi (Achard, 1915)

Synonyms
- Anomalispa gestroi Achard, 1915

Species of beetle

Coelaenomenodera gestroi is a species of beetle of the family Chrysomelidae. It is found in Madagascar.

== Biology ==
The food plant is unknown.
