= Wallacea impicta =

Scientific classification
- Kingdom: Animalia
- Phylum: Arthropoda
- Clade: Pancrustacea
- Class: Insecta
- Order: Coleoptera
- Suborder: Polyphaga
- Infraorder: Cucujiformia
- Family: Chrysomelidae
- Genus: Wallacea
- Species: W. impicta

Binomial name
- Wallacea impicta (Uhmann, 1931)

Synonyms
- Wallaceana impicta Uhmann, 1931; Pistosia impicta

Species of beetle

Wallacea impicta is a species of beetle in the family Chrysomelidae. It is found in the Philippines (Luzon, Masbate, Mindanao).
