= Anisodera fraterna =

Scientific classification
- Kingdom: Animalia
- Phylum: Arthropoda
- Class: Insecta
- Order: Coleoptera
- Suborder: Polyphaga
- Infraorder: Cucujiformia
- Family: Chrysomelidae
- Genus: Anisodera
- Species: A. fraterna

Binomial name
- Anisodera fraterna Baly, 1888

Synonyms
- Anisodera brevipennis Pic, 1924; Anisodera sinuaticollis Pic, 1926

Species of beetle

Anisodera fraterna is a species of beetle of the family Chrysomelidae. It is found in China, India, Indonesia (Sumatra), Laos, Malaysia, Myanmar, Nepal and Vietnam.
