= Anisodera submarginella =

Scientific classification
- Kingdom: Animalia
- Phylum: Arthropoda
- Class: Insecta
- Order: Coleoptera
- Suborder: Polyphaga
- Infraorder: Cucujiformia
- Family: Chrysomelidae
- Genus: Anisodera
- Species: A. submarginella

Binomial name
- Anisodera submarginella Uhmann, 1960

Species of beetle

Anisodera submarginella is a species of beetle of the family Chrysomelidae. It is found in Indonesia (Borneo) and Malaysia.
