= Anisodera gracilis =

Scientific classification
- Kingdom: Animalia
- Phylum: Arthropoda
- Clade: Pancrustacea
- Class: Insecta
- Order: Coleoptera
- Suborder: Polyphaga
- Infraorder: Cucujiformia
- Family: Chrysomelidae
- Genus: Anisodera
- Species: A. gracilis

Binomial name
- Anisodera gracilis (Guérin-Méneville, 1840)

Synonyms
- Bothryonopa gracilis Guérin-Méneville, 1840

Species of beetle

Anisodera gracilis is a species of beetle of the family Chrysomelidae. It is found in Indonesia (Java and Sumatra).

== Description ==
Adults reach a length of about 3.2 mm.

== Biology ==
They have been recorded feeding on Musa and Zingiber species.
