= Anisodera ferruginea =

Scientific classification
- Kingdom: Animalia
- Phylum: Arthropoda
- Class: Insecta
- Order: Coleoptera
- Suborder: Polyphaga
- Infraorder: Cucujiformia
- Family: Chrysomelidae
- Genus: Anisodera
- Species: A. ferruginea

Binomial name
- Anisodera ferruginea (Fabricius, 1801)

Synonyms
- Alurnus ferrugineus Fabricius, 1801; Anisodera whitei Baly, 1858

Species of beetle

Anisodera ferruginea is a species of beetle of the family Chrysomelidae. It is found in Indonesia (Sumatra).
