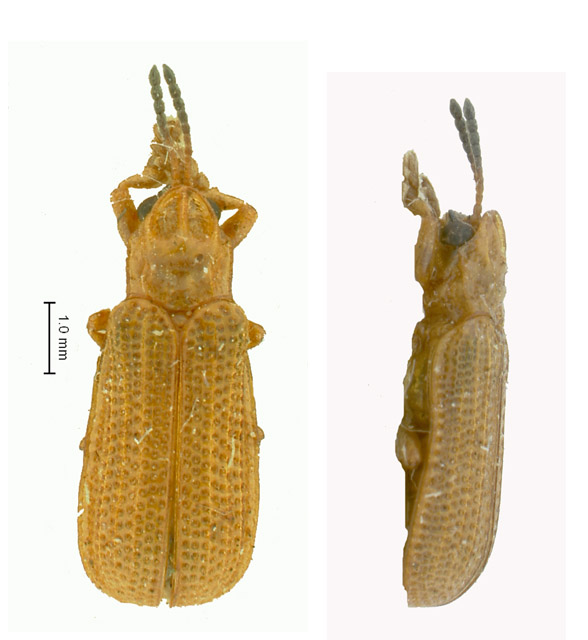

Scientific classification
- Kingdom: Animalia
- Phylum: Arthropoda
- Clade: Pancrustacea
- Class: Insecta
- Order: Coleoptera
- Suborder: Polyphaga
- Infraorder: Cucujiformia
- Family: Chrysomelidae
- Genus: Coelaenomenodera
- Species: C. elaeidis

Binomial name
- Coelaenomenodera elaeidis Maulik, 1920

Synonyms
- Coelaenomenodera (Coelaenomenodera) minuta Uhmann, 1927

= Coelaenomenodera elaeidis =

Species of beetle

Coelaenomenodera elaeidis is a species of beetle of the family Chrysomelidae. It is found in Cameroon, Equatorial Guinea, Ghana, Ivory Coast and Sierra Leone.

== Biology ==
The recorded food plants are Cocos nucifera, Elaeis guineensis, Elaeis oleifera and Borassus species.
