= Anisodera suturella =

Scientific classification
- Kingdom: Animalia
- Phylum: Arthropoda
- Clade: Pancrustacea
- Class: Insecta
- Order: Coleoptera
- Suborder: Polyphaga
- Infraorder: Cucujiformia
- Family: Chrysomelidae
- Genus: Anisodera
- Species: A. suturella

Binomial name
- Anisodera suturella Uhmann, 1939

Species of beetle

Anisodera suturella is a species of beetle in the family Chrysomelidae. Described by German entomologist Erich Uhmann in 1939, it is found in Indonesia on the island of Java. It is known to feed on Amomum species.
