= Wallacea abscisa =

Scientific classification
- Kingdom: Animalia
- Phylum: Arthropoda
- Clade: Pancrustacea
- Class: Insecta
- Order: Coleoptera
- Suborder: Polyphaga
- Infraorder: Cucujiformia
- Family: Chrysomelidae
- Genus: Wallacea
- Species: W. abscisa

Binomial name
- Wallacea abscisa (Uhmann, 1939)

Synonyms
- Wallaceana abscisa Uhmann, 1939; Pistosia abscisa

Species of beetle

Wallacea abscisa is a species of beetle of the family Chrysomelidae. It is found in China (Yunnan) and Myanmar.
