= Wallacea (beetle) =

Scientific classification
- Kingdom: Animalia
- Phylum: Arthropoda
- Class: Insecta
- Order: Coleoptera
- Suborder: Polyphaga
- Infraorder: Cucujiformia
- Family: Chrysomelidae
- Subfamily: Cassidinae
- Tribe: Bothryonopini
- Genus: Wallacea; Baly, 1859

Synonyms
- Wallaceana Maulik, 1928

Genus of leaf beetles

Wallacea is a genus of beetles belonging to the family Chrysomelidae.

== Species ==
- Wallacea abscisa (Uhmann, 1939)
- Wallacea angulicollis Gestro, 1911
- Wallacea apicalis Gestro, 1896
- Wallacea bakeri Gestro, 1919
- Wallacea biseriata (Uhmann, 1931)
- Wallacea bowringii Baly, 1859
- Wallacea collaris Baly, 1859
- Wallacea compta Gestro, 1913
- Wallacea conspicua Gestro, 1899
- Wallacea costata (Uhmann, 1939)
- Wallacea costipennis (Uhmann, 1931)
- Wallacea dactyliferae Maulik, 1919
- Wallacea distinguenda Baly, 1859
- Wallacea drescheri (Uhmann, 1935)
- Wallacea fasciata (Uhmann, 1948)
- Wallacea gorbunovi (Medvedev, 1997)
- Wallacea impicta (Uhmann, 1931)
- Wallacea inornata Gestro, 1892
- Wallacea insolita Gestro, 1899
- Wallacea limbata Gestro, 1906
- Wallacea marginata Gestro, 1896
- Wallacea neglecta Gestro, 1903
- Wallacea nigra (Chen & Sun, 1964)
- Wallacea phoenicia (Maulik, 1930)
- Wallacea raapii Gestro, 1898
- Wallacea sparsepunctata Pic, 1939
- Wallacea spectabilis Gestro, 1897
- Wallacea terminalis Gestro, 1917
- Wallacea vittata Gestro, 1919
