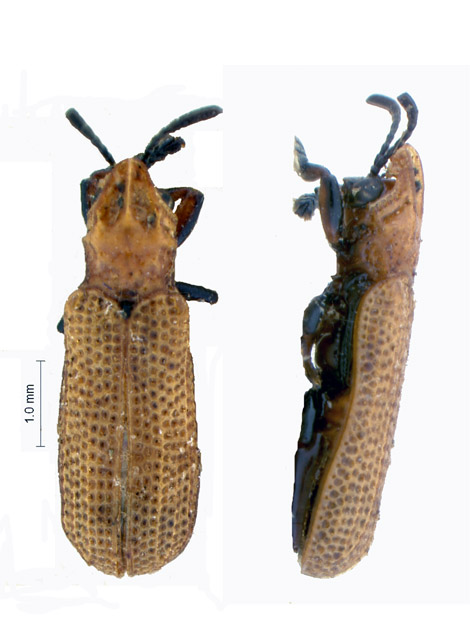

Scientific classification
- Kingdom: Animalia
- Phylum: Arthropoda
- Clade: Pancrustacea
- Class: Insecta
- Order: Coleoptera
- Suborder: Polyphaga
- Infraorder: Cucujiformia
- Family: Chrysomelidae
- Genus: Coelaenomenodera
- Species: C. perrieri

Binomial name
- Coelaenomenodera perrieri Fairmaire, 1898

= Coelaenomenodera perrieri =

Species of beetle

Coelaenomenodera perrieri is a species of beetle of the family Chrysomelidae. It is found in Madagascar.

== Biology ==
The recorded food plant is Cocos nucifera.
