= Coelaenomenodera tarsata =

Scientific classification
- Kingdom: Animalia
- Phylum: Arthropoda
- Clade: Pancrustacea
- Class: Insecta
- Order: Coleoptera
- Suborder: Polyphaga
- Infraorder: Cucujiformia
- Family: Chrysomelidae
- Genus: Coelaenomenodera
- Species: C. tarsata

Binomial name
- Coelaenomenodera tarsata Baly, 1858

Species of beetle

Coelaenomenodera tarsata is a species of beetle of the family Chrysomelidae. It is found in Madagascar.

== Description ==
Adults are elongate, slightly broader behind, subconvex, somewhat flattened along the back and pale fulvous. The eyes, lower half of the face, the two basal joints of the antennae and the tarsi, black. There is a small spot in the middle of the thorax at its base, the scutellum, a longitudinal stripe on the side of the pleura, the knees and tibiae, fuscous. The head is punctured. The thorax is longer than broad, the sides rounded, narrowed near the base, narrowed and sinuate in front, their posterior angles produced laterally into a small acute tooth, the apex produced and angled in front (but not entirely concealing the head from above), impressed on either side the central line with a large, shallow, ovate fovea, its surface closely punctured. The disc has several large shallow depressions, whole surface closely pale fulvous, a small spot at the middle of the base, running upwards a short distance along the medial line, fuscous. The scutellum is shining fuscous. The elytra are broader than the thorax, slightly dilated behind, the sides narrowly margined, the apex acutely above subconvex, indistinctly flattened along the suture, deeply punctate-striate, the interstices indistinctly elevated.

== Biology ==
The food plant is unknown.
