= Anisodera lucidiventris =

Scientific classification
- Kingdom: Animalia
- Phylum: Arthropoda
- Clade: Pancrustacea
- Class: Insecta
- Order: Coleoptera
- Suborder: Polyphaga
- Infraorder: Cucujiformia
- Family: Chrysomelidae
- Genus: Anisodera
- Species: A. lucidiventris

Binomial name
- Anisodera lucidiventris Guérin-Méneville, 1840

Species of beetle

Anisodera lucidiventris is a species of beetle in the family Chrysomelidae. It is found in Indonesia (Borneo, Java, Sumatra), Malaysia and the Philippines (Mindanao).

== Biology ==
They have been recorded feeding on Amomum species.
