= Wallacea nigra =

Scientific classification
- Kingdom: Animalia
- Phylum: Arthropoda
- Clade: Pancrustacea
- Class: Insecta
- Order: Coleoptera
- Suborder: Polyphaga
- Infraorder: Cucujiformia
- Family: Chrysomelidae
- Genus: Wallacea
- Species: W. nigra

Binomial name
- Wallacea nigra (Chen & Sun, 1964)

Synonyms
- Wallaceana nigra Chen & Sun, 1964; Pistosia nigra

Species of beetle

Wallacea nigra is a species of beetle in the family Chrysomelidae. It is found in Vietnam.
