= Coelaenomenodera collarti =

Scientific classification
- Kingdom: Animalia
- Phylum: Arthropoda
- Clade: Pancrustacea
- Class: Insecta
- Order: Coleoptera
- Suborder: Polyphaga
- Infraorder: Cucujiformia
- Family: Chrysomelidae
- Genus: Coelaenomenodera
- Species: C. collarti

Binomial name
- Coelaenomenodera collarti Uhmann, 1936

Species of beetle

Coelaenomenodera collarti is a species of beetle of the family Chrysomelidae. It is found in Congo.

== Biology ==
The food plant is unknown.
