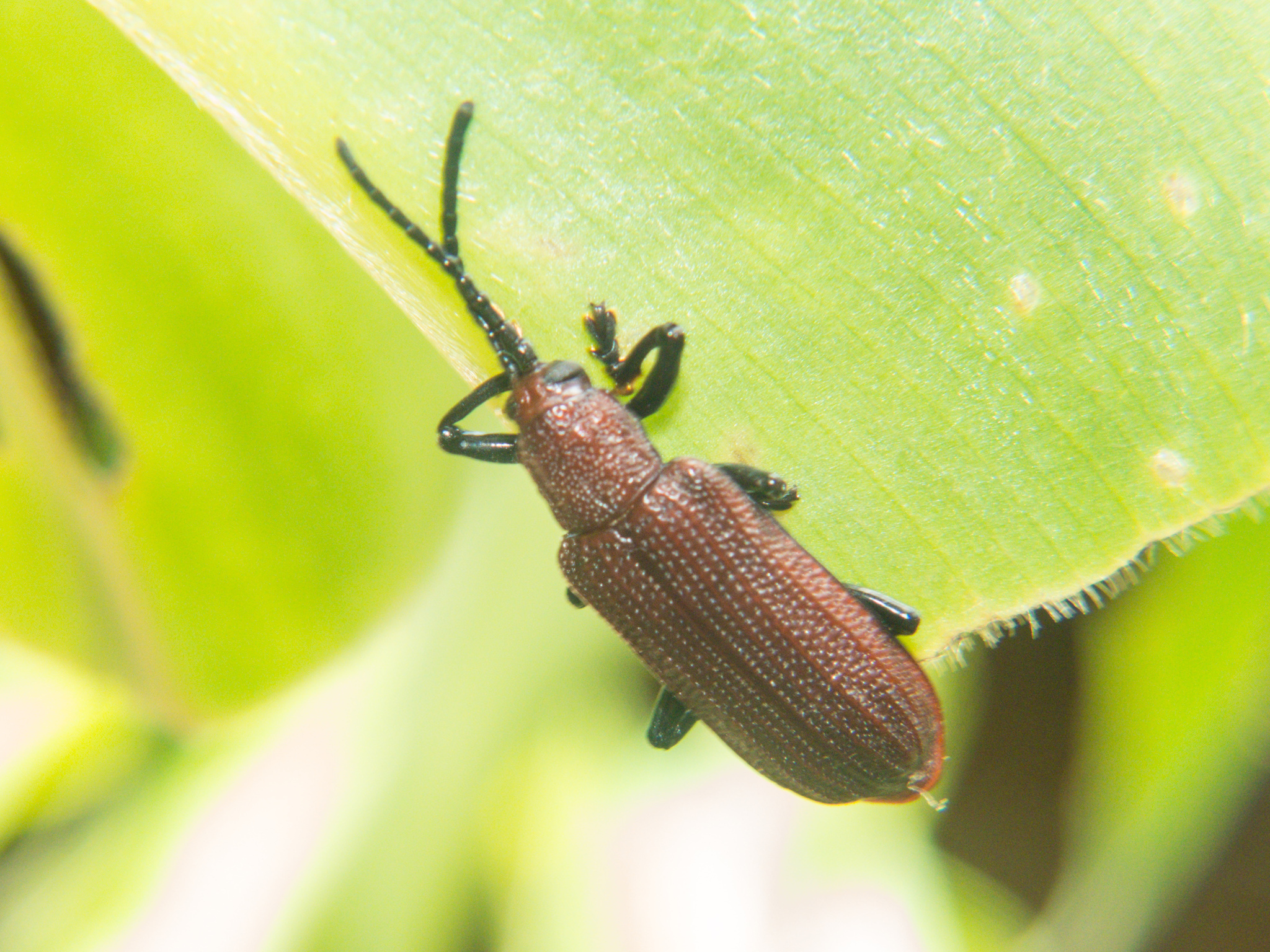

Scientific classification
- Kingdom: Animalia
- Phylum: Arthropoda
- Clade: Pancrustacea
- Class: Insecta
- Order: Coleoptera
- Suborder: Polyphaga
- Infraorder: Cucujiformia
- Family: Chrysomelidae
- Genus: Anisodera
- Species: A. guerini

Binomial name
- Anisodera guerini Baly, 1858

Synonyms
- Anisodera ferruginea Guérin-Méneville, 1840 (preocc.); Anisodera foveolata Pic, 1924; Anisodera sinuaticollis Pic, 1926

= Anisodera guerini =

Species of beetle

Anisodera guerini is a species of beetle of the family Chrysomelidae. It is found in Bangladesh, China (Guangai, Yunnan), India (Arunachal Pradesh, Assam, Kerala, Meghalaya, Sikkim), Indonesia (Java, Sumatra), Malaysia, Myanmar, Sri Lanka, Thailand and Vietnam.

== Biology ==
They have been recorded feeding on Costus speciosus.
