= Wallacea bowringii =

Scientific classification
- Kingdom: Animalia
- Phylum: Arthropoda
- Clade: Pancrustacea
- Class: Insecta
- Order: Coleoptera
- Suborder: Polyphaga
- Infraorder: Cucujiformia
- Family: Chrysomelidae
- Genus: Wallacea
- Species: W. bowringii

Binomial name
- Wallacea bowringii Baly, 1859

Synonyms
- Pistosia bowringii

Species of beetle

Wallacea bowringii is a species of beetle in the family Chrysomelidae. It is found in Indonesia (Java).
