= Wallacea gorbunovi =

Scientific classification
- Kingdom: Animalia
- Phylum: Arthropoda
- Clade: Pancrustacea
- Class: Insecta
- Order: Coleoptera
- Suborder: Polyphaga
- Infraorder: Cucujiformia
- Family: Chrysomelidae
- Genus: Wallacea
- Species: W. gorbunovi

Binomial name
- Wallacea gorbunovi (Medvedev, 1997)

Synonyms
- Pistocia gorbunovi Medvedev, 1997; Pistosia gorbunovi

Species of beetle

Wallacea gorbunovi is a species of beetle in the family Chrysomelidae. It is found in Nepal.
