= Coelaenomenodera costulata =

Scientific classification
- Kingdom: Animalia
- Phylum: Arthropoda
- Clade: Pancrustacea
- Class: Insecta
- Order: Coleoptera
- Suborder: Polyphaga
- Infraorder: Cucujiformia
- Family: Chrysomelidae
- Genus: Coelaenomenodera
- Species: C. costulata

Binomial name
- Coelaenomenodera costulata Kolbe in Stuhlmann, 1897

Synonyms
- Coelaenomenodera tangana Uhmann, 1928

Species of beetle

Coelaenomenodera costulata is a species of beetle of the family Chrysomelidae. It is found in Kenya and Madagascar.

== Biology ==
The food plant is unknown.
