= Anisodera sheppardi =

Scientific classification
- Kingdom: Animalia
- Phylum: Arthropoda
- Clade: Pancrustacea
- Class: Insecta
- Order: Coleoptera
- Suborder: Polyphaga
- Infraorder: Cucujiformia
- Family: Chrysomelidae
- Genus: Anisodera
- Species: A. sheppardi

Binomial name
- Anisodera sheppardi Baly, 1858

Species of beetle

Anisodera sheppardi is a species of beetle of the family Chrysomelidae. It is found in Indonesia (Borneo, Sumatra) and Malaysia.
