= Wallacea fasciata =

Scientific classification
- Kingdom: Animalia
- Phylum: Arthropoda
- Clade: Pancrustacea
- Class: Insecta
- Order: Coleoptera
- Suborder: Polyphaga
- Infraorder: Cucujiformia
- Family: Chrysomelidae
- Genus: Wallacea
- Species: W. fasciata

Binomial name
- Wallacea fasciata (Uhmann, 1948)

Synonyms
- Wallaceana fasciata Uhmann, 1948; Pistosia fasciata

Species of beetle

Wallacea fasciata is a species of beetle in the family Chrysomelidae. It is found in Vietnam.
