= Wallacea distinguenda =

Scientific classification
- Kingdom: Animalia
- Phylum: Arthropoda
- Clade: Pancrustacea
- Class: Insecta
- Order: Coleoptera
- Suborder: Polyphaga
- Infraorder: Cucujiformia
- Family: Chrysomelidae
- Genus: Wallacea
- Species: W. distinguenda

Binomial name
- Wallacea distinguenda Baly, 1859

Synonyms
- Pistosia distinguenda

Species of beetle

Wallacea distinguenda is a species of leaf beetle in the family Chrysomelidae that is endemic to Sulawesi, Indonesia.
