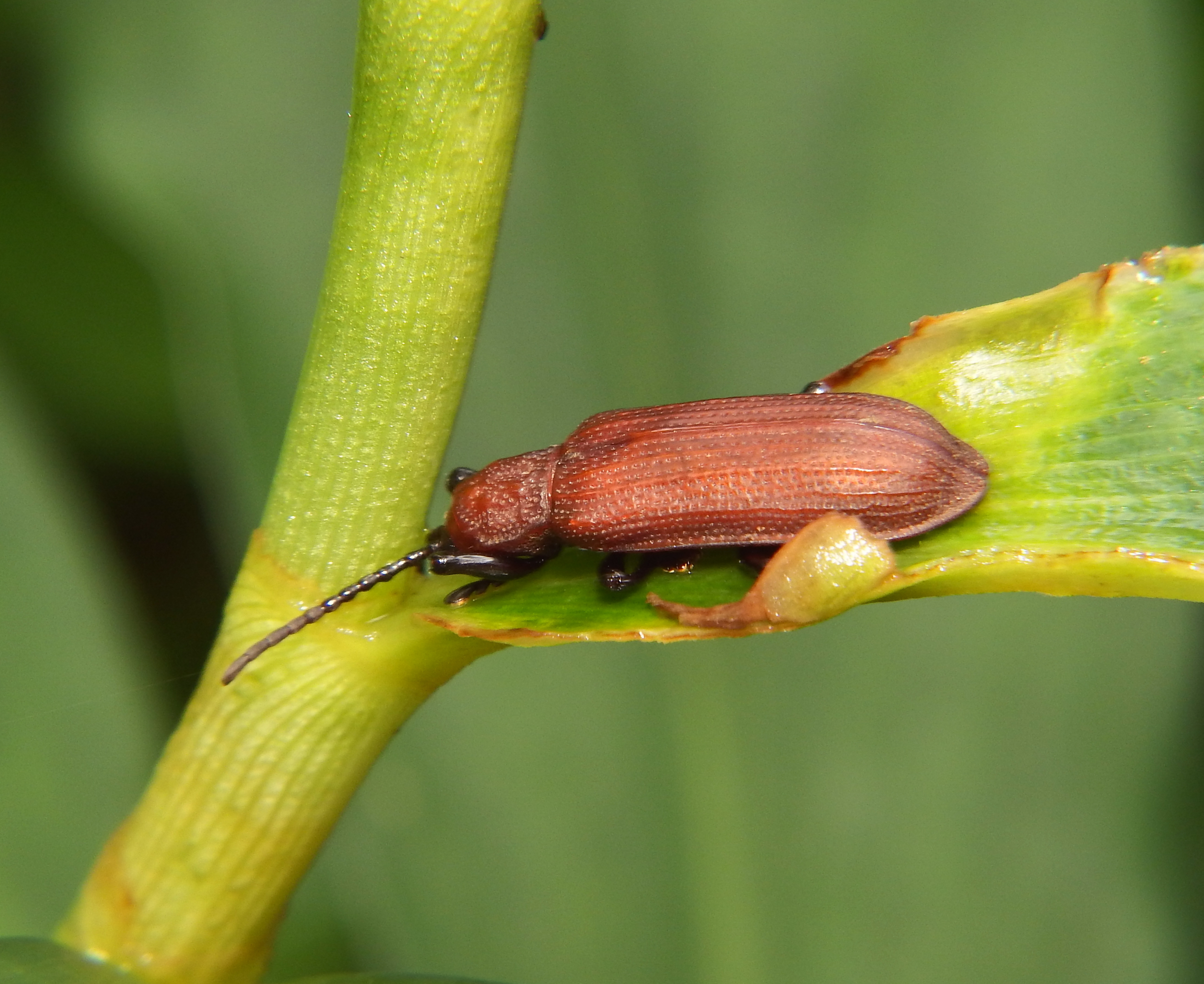

Scientific classification
- Kingdom: Animalia
- Phylum: Arthropoda
- Class: Insecta
- Order: Coleoptera
- Suborder: Polyphaga
- Infraorder: Cucujiformia
- Family: Chrysomelidae
- Subfamily: Cassidinae
- Tribe: Anisoderini
- Genus: Anisodera; Chevrolat, 1836

Synonyms
- Lissochila Weise, 1911

= Anisodera =

Genus of leaf beetles

Anisodera is a genus of beetles belonging to the family Chrysomelidae.

== Species ==
- Anisodera batangae Uhmann, 1954
- Anisodera bloetei Uhmann, 1930
- Anisodera bowringii Baly, 1858
- Anisodera brevelineata Pic, 1924
- Anisodera candezei Gestro, 1897
- Anisodera carinifera Uhmann, 1960
- Anisodera cornuta Uhmann, 1928
- Anisodera densa Uhmann, 1937
- Anisodera elongata Gestro, 1885
- Anisodera fallax Gestro, 1899
- Anisodera ferruginea (Fabricius, 1801)
- Anisodera fraterna Baly, 1888
- Anisodera gracilis (Guérin-Méneville, 1840)
- Anisodera guerini Baly, 1858
- Anisodera humilis Gestro, 1897
- Anisodera integra Weise, 1922
- Anisodera lucidiventris Guérin-Méneville, 1840
- Anisodera marginella Weise, 1922
- Anisodera modesta Weise, 1922
- Anisodera nigrolineata Gestro, 1906
- Anisodera obscura Gestro, 1897
- Anisodera propinqua Baly, 1888
- Anisodera rugulosa Chen & Yu, 1964
- Anisodera rusticana Weise, 1897
- Anisodera sculpticollis Gestro, 1909
- Anisodera scutellata Baly, 1858
- Anisodera sheppardi Baly, 1858
- Anisodera sinuata Weise, 1922
- Anisodera submarginella Uhmann, 1960
- Anisodera suturella Uhmann, 1939
- Anisodera testacea Gestro, 1897
- Anisodera tuberosa Gestro, 1897
- Anisodera wegneri Uhmann, 1960
