= Anisodera propinqua =

Scientific classification
- Kingdom: Animalia
- Phylum: Arthropoda
- Class: Insecta
- Order: Coleoptera
- Suborder: Polyphaga
- Infraorder: Cucujiformia
- Family: Chrysomelidae
- Genus: Anisodera
- Species: A. propinqua

Binomial name
- Anisodera propinqua Baly, 1888

Synonyms
- Anisodera barbicornis Weise, 1897

Species of beetle

Anisodera propinqua is a species of beetle of the family Chrysomelidae. It is found in China (Yunnan), India (Assam), Laos, Myanmar and Thailand.

== Biology ==
They have been recorded feeding on Musa basjoo.
