= Coelaenomenodera cucullata =

Scientific classification
- Kingdom: Animalia
- Phylum: Arthropoda
- Clade: Pancrustacea
- Class: Insecta
- Order: Coleoptera
- Suborder: Polyphaga
- Infraorder: Cucujiformia
- Family: Chrysomelidae
- Genus: Coelaenomenodera
- Species: C. cucullata

Binomial name
- Coelaenomenodera cucullata (Guérin-Méneville in Cuvier, 1844)

Synonyms
- Acentroptera cucullata Uhmann, 1928; Coelaenomenodera thomsonii Gestro, 1909; Coelaenomenodera cucullata fuscicornis Weise, 1922

Species of beetle

Coelaenomenodera cucullata is a species of beetle of the family Chrysomelidae. It is found in Madagascar.

== Biology ==
The food plant is unknown.
