= Wallacea costata =

Scientific classification
- Kingdom: Animalia
- Phylum: Arthropoda
- Clade: Pancrustacea
- Class: Insecta
- Order: Coleoptera
- Suborder: Polyphaga
- Infraorder: Cucujiformia
- Family: Chrysomelidae
- Genus: Wallacea
- Species: W. costata

Binomial name
- Wallacea costata (Uhmann, 1939)

Synonyms
- Wallaceana costata Uhmann, 1939; Pistosia costata

Species of beetle

Wallacea costata is a species of beetle in the family Chrysomelidae. It is found in Indonesia (Java).
