= Wallacea phoenicia =

Scientific classification
- Kingdom: Animalia
- Phylum: Arthropoda
- Clade: Pancrustacea
- Class: Insecta
- Order: Coleoptera
- Suborder: Polyphaga
- Infraorder: Cucujiformia
- Family: Chrysomelidae
- Genus: Wallacea
- Species: W. phoenicia

Binomial name
- Wallacea phoenicia (Maulik, 1930)

Synonyms
- Wallaceana phoenicia Maulik, 1930; Pistosia phoenicia

Species of beetle

Wallacea phoenicia is a species of beetle in the family Chrysomelidae. It is found in Malaysia (Selangor).

== Biology ==
Wallacea phoenicia feeds on Eleiodoxa conferta, Oncosperma tigillarium, Phoenix species, Arenga species and Salacca species.
