= Coelaenomenodera praeusta =

Scientific classification
- Kingdom: Animalia
- Phylum: Arthropoda
- Clade: Pancrustacea
- Class: Insecta
- Order: Coleoptera
- Suborder: Polyphaga
- Infraorder: Cucujiformia
- Family: Chrysomelidae
- Genus: Coelaenomenodera
- Species: C. praeusta

Binomial name
- Coelaenomenodera praeusta (Guérin-Méneville in Cuvier, 1844)

Synonyms
- Acentroptera praeusta Guérin-Méneville, 1844

Species of beetle

Coelaenomenodera praeusta is a species of beetle of the family Chrysomelidae. It is found in Madagascar.

== Biology ==
The food plant is unknown.
