= Coelaenomenodera leroyi =

Scientific classification
- Kingdom: Animalia
- Phylum: Arthropoda
- Clade: Pancrustacea
- Class: Insecta
- Order: Coleoptera
- Suborder: Polyphaga
- Infraorder: Cucujiformia
- Family: Chrysomelidae
- Genus: Coelaenomenodera
- Species: C. leroyi

Binomial name
- Coelaenomenodera leroyi Fairmaire, 1880

Species of beetle

Coelaenomenodera leroyi is a species of beetle of the family Chrysomelidae. It is found in Madagascar.

== Biology ==
The food plant is unknown.
