= Wallacea dactyliferae =

Scientific classification
- Kingdom: Animalia
- Phylum: Arthropoda
- Clade: Pancrustacea
- Class: Insecta
- Order: Coleoptera
- Suborder: Polyphaga
- Infraorder: Cucujiformia
- Family: Chrysomelidae
- Genus: Wallacea
- Species: W. dactyliferae

Binomial name
- Wallacea dactyliferae Maulik, 1919

Synonyms
- Pistosia dactyliferae

Species of beetle

Wallacea dactyliferae is a species of beetle of the family Chrysomelidae. It is found in Bangladesh, China (Yunnan), India (Bihar, Tamil Nadu, Karnataka), Taiwan, Thailand and Vietnam. The species was introduced and is now established in France.

== Biology ==
Wallacea dactyliferae feeds on Phoenix species (including Phoenix canariensis), Borassus flabellifer, Calamus species, Arenga tremula, Chamaerops humilis and Washingtonia filifera.
