= Raffaello Gestro =

Italian entomologist (1845–1936)

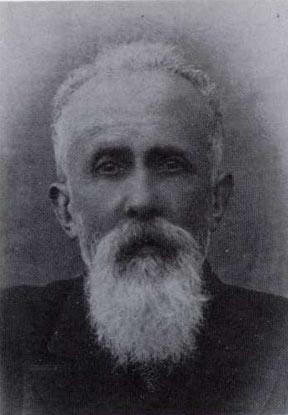
- Born: Luigi Ignazio Benedetto Raffaele; March 21, 1845; Genoa
- Died: June 6, 1936 (aged 91); Genoa, Italy
- Education: University of Genoa
- Known for: Specialist in Coleoptera and cave Carabidae, describing 936 new species
- Children: 3
- Scientific career
- Fields: Entomology, Zoology
- Workplaces: Natural History Museum of Giacomo Doria; Italian Entomological Society
- Patrons: Giacomo Doria
- Academic advisors: Giuseppe De Notaris, G. Ramorino
- Author abbrev. (zoology): Gestro

Raffaello Gestro (21 March 1845, Genoa – 6 June 1936, Genoa) was an Italian entomologist who specialised in Coleoptera. Gestro was the Director of the Natural History Museum of Giacomo Doria Genoa where his collection is conserved. He was a Member and President of the Italian Entomological Society.

== Life and work ==
Gestro was born in Genoa, the son of Carlo Domenico and Luigia Semino. His full name was Luigi Ignazio Benedetto Raffaele but he always used just Raffaello. He studied at classical high school before joining the University of Genoa to study medicine. He became interested in botany under Giuseppe De Notaris and then in zoology thanks to G. Ramorino who was an assistant to Pietro Mansueto Ferrari. In 1864 he was introduced to Giacomo Doria who got him to examine Pomatomus saltator from the Ligurian Sea. When Doria went to Borneo with Odoardo Beccari in 1865, Gestro was made in-charge of the collections. In 1866 he graduated in medicine and volunteered with the Garibaldi medical corps during the third war of independence in Trentino. He then worked at Genoa. Doria returned with large collections which led the city to found a new museum of natural history in 1867. Doria served as director with Gestro as his deputy. He published notes from 1870 to 1935 on the collections serving as the editor for the museum journal. He also taught natural sciences at the A. D'Oria high school from 1879 to 1892. In 1913 he became director of the museum following the death of Doria.

Gestro worked mainly on the insect collections and described nearly 936 new species. He took a special interest in the Italian cave Carabidae.

Gestro was a member of the Italian entomological society from 1871. He was also appointed grand officer of the Crown of Italy and knight of the Order of Gustavus Vasa of Sweden. He married Anneta Verdone and they had three daughters.

== Works ==
Expedition Insects - Indicating the amount and origin of insects collected for Genoa Natural History Museum from 1874-1895

- 1874, 1876. Enumerazione dei Cetonidi raccolti nell´ Archipelago Malese e nella Papuasia dai signori G. Doria O. Beccari e L. M. D´Albertis e A. A. Bruyn. Annali del Museo Civico di Storia Naturale di Genova 6: 487-535,8: 512-524, 9: 83-100.
- 1878. Contribuzione allo studio dei Cetonidi della regione Austro-Malese.Annali del Museo Civico di Storia Naturale di Genova 12: 26-31.
- 1881. Spedizione Italiana Africa Equatoriale (1880-1884). Annali del Museo Civico di Storia Naturale di Genova 16: 204.
- 1888. Viaggio di Leonardo Fea in Birmania e regioni vicine. IV. Nuove speciedi Coleotteri. Annali del Museo Civico di Storia Naturale di Genova 26: 87-132, figs.
- 1889 Viaggio ad Assab nel Mar Rosso dei Signori G. Doria ed O. Beccari con il R. Avviso “Esploratore” dal 16 Novembre 1879 al 26 Febbraio 1880. IV. Coleotteri. Annali del Museo Civico di Storia Naturale di Genova (Serie 2a) 7(27):5-72.
- 1890. Sopra alcune Cetonie dell´isola Nias e della costa occidentale di Sumatra raccolte dal Dott. Elio Modigliani. Annali del Museo Civico di Storia Naturale di Genova: 93-99.
- 1891. Viaggio di Leonardo Fea in Birmania e regioni vicine. XXXVII.Enumerazione delle Cetonie. Annali del Museo Civico di Storia Naturale di Genova ser. 2, vol. 10: 835-876. pl. II.
- 1893. Viaggio di Lamberto Loria della Papuasia orientale, X, Nuove specie di Coleotteri Annali del Museo Civico di Storia Naturale di Genova ser. 2, vol. 13: 285-293.
- 1895. Esplorazione del Giuba. 16. Coleotteri. Annali del Museo Civico di Storia Naturale di Genova(2a) 15 (35): 247-478.
- 1895 Esplorazione del Giuba e dei suoi affluenti compiuta dal Cap. V. Bottego (1892–93), Coleotteri XVI, Fam. Buprestidae. Annali del Museo Civico di Storia Naturale di Genova (2) 15:247-478 (338-350).

Taxonomic

- 1910. Pars 1. Rhysodidae and Pars 5. Cupedidae, Paussidae.in S. Schenkling (ed.), Coleopterorum Catalogus. W. Junk, Berlin.

== Other sources ==
- Conci, C. & Poggi, R. 1996: Iconography of Italian Entomologists, with essential biographical data. Mem. Soc. Ent. Ital. 75:159-382.
