= Dicladispa alternata =

Scientific classification
- Kingdom: Animalia
- Phylum: Arthropoda
- Clade: Pancrustacea
- Class: Insecta
- Order: Coleoptera
- Suborder: Polyphaga
- Infraorder: Cucujiformia
- Family: Chrysomelidae
- Genus: Dicladispa
- Species: D. alternata

Binomial name
- Dicladispa alternata (Chapuis, 1877)

Synonyms
- Hispa alternata Chapuis, 1877; Hispa muricata Gestro, 1885

Species of beetle

Dicladispa alternata is a species of beetle of the family Chrysomelidae. It is found in Indonesia (Java, Sumatra).

== Life history ==
The recorded host plant for this species is Saccharum spontaneum.

== Taxonomy ==
Dicladispa megacantha is treated as a synonym of this species in some sources.
