= Dicladispa varii =

Scientific classification
- Kingdom: Animalia
- Phylum: Arthropoda
- Class: Insecta
- Order: Coleoptera
- Suborder: Polyphaga
- Infraorder: Cucujiformia
- Family: Chrysomelidae
- Genus: Dicladispa
- Species: D. varii

Binomial name
- Dicladispa varii Uhmann, 1957

Species of beetle

Dicladispa varii is a species of beetle of the family Chrysomelidae. It is found in South Africa.

== Life history ==
The recorded host plant for this species is Rhynchosia confusa.
