= Dicladispa vicinalis =

Scientific classification
- Kingdom: Animalia
- Phylum: Arthropoda
- Class: Insecta
- Order: Coleoptera
- Suborder: Polyphaga
- Infraorder: Cucujiformia
- Family: Chrysomelidae
- Genus: Dicladispa
- Species: D. vicinalis

Binomial name
- Dicladispa vicinalis (Péringuey, 1898)

Synonyms
- Hispa vicinalis Péringuey, 1898

Species of beetle

Dicladispa vicinalis is a species of beetle of the family Chrysomelidae. It is found in Angola, Congo, Kenya, Rwanda, South Africa, Tanzania and Zimbabwe.

== Life history ==
The recorded host plant for this species is Grewia occidentalis.
