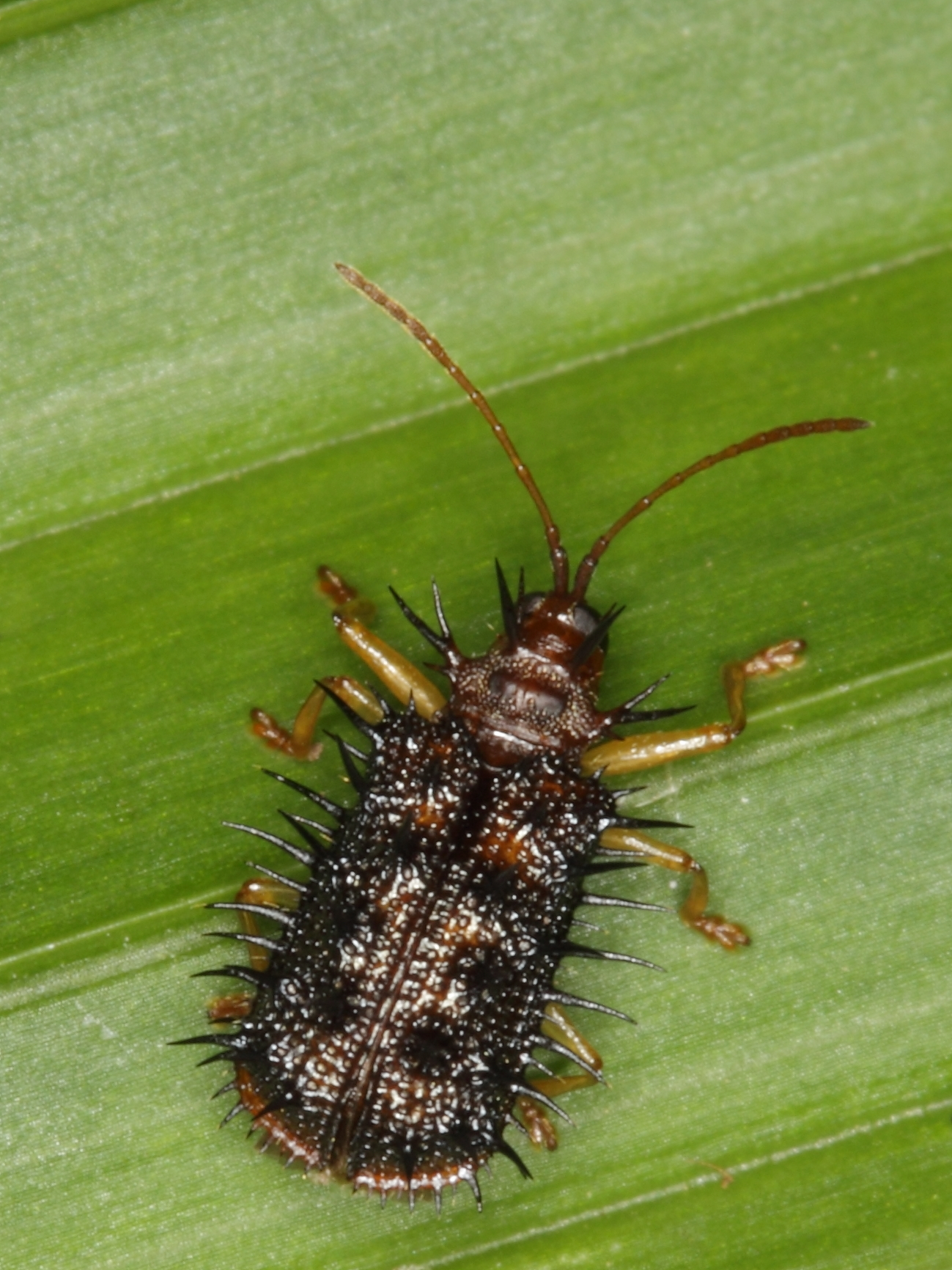
- Dicladispa armigera specimen in Java

Scientific classification
- Kingdom: Animalia
- Phylum: Arthropoda
- Class: Insecta
- Order: Coleoptera
- Suborder: Polyphaga
- Infraorder: Cucujiformia
- Family: Chrysomelidae
- Tribe: Hispini
- Genus: Dicladispa
- Species: D. armigera

Binomial name
- Dicladispa armigera (Olivier, 1808)

Synonyms
- Hispa armigera Olivier, 1808; Notosacantha armigera (Olivier, 1808); Hispa cyanipennis Motschulsky, 1861; Hispa aenescens Baly, 1887; Hispa boutani Weise, 1905; Hispa similis Uhmann, 1927; Hispa semicyanea Pic, 1932; Dicladispa yunusi Abdullah & Qureshi, 1969

= Dicladispa armigera =

Species of beetle

Dicladispa armigera is a species of leaf beetle from Southeast Asia, often known by its common name: the "rice hispa". These beetles are a well known invasive pest, and are responsible for significant crop damage across many countries. The male to female ratio is between 1:1.26 and 1:1.46.

== Description ==
=== Eggs ===
Rice hispa eggs laid by the female beetle are usually inserted beneath the epidermis of the underside of leaves. Occasionally, the eggs are also laid on the top side of leaves. The eggs are minute, covered in a dark substance, and laid singly. Each female lays a total of between 18 and 101 eggs in their lifetime, with an average of 55. The incubation period is about four days.

=== Larvae ===
The larvae, on hatching, are ~2.4mm long, dorsoventrally flattened, and pale yellow. They mine into the leaf, feeding on the green tissues and only leaving the two epidermal layers. The activity of the larvae will often leave an irregular discolored pattern on the leaf. Larvae will feed and pupate within the leaf, without needing to migrate to a fresh leaf. A fully grown larva is ~5.5 mm long, dorsoventrally flattened, and a dull pale yellow. The larval period lasts for 7–12 days, and is followed by pupation.

=== Pupae ===
D. armigera pupae are dorsoventrally flattened, brown, and appropriately 4.9mm long. The pupal stage last for about 4 days.

=== Adults ===
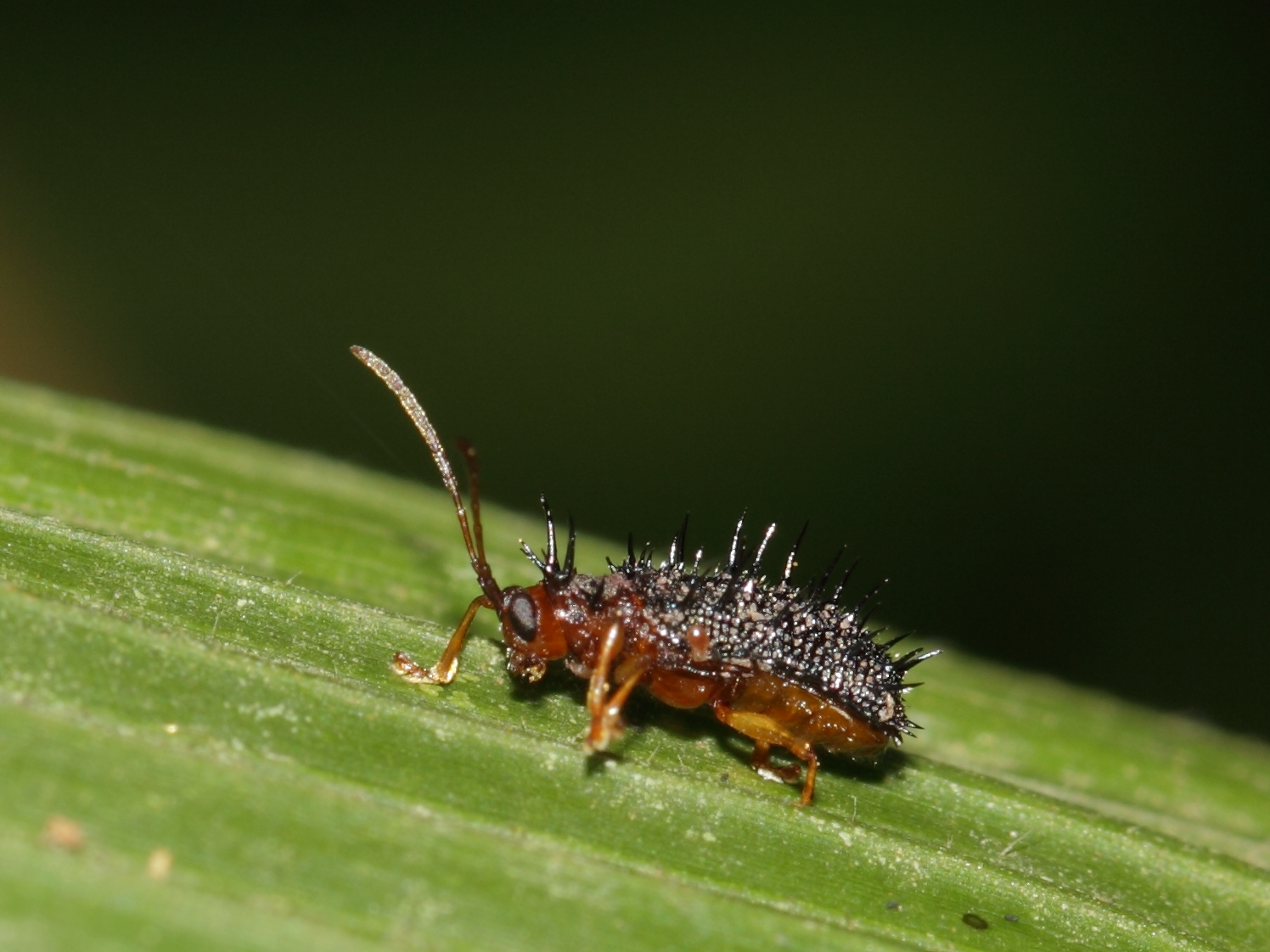
Mature imago on a leaf

Finally the adult beetle, known as an imago, emerges and cuts its way out of the larval tunnel and surrounding leaf. The imago is ~5mm long, and bluish black with a spiny body. The average longevity of the adult is 24 days for the female, and 16 days for the male, although some individuals have been known to live as long as 90 days. Adults have long, well-developed spines on the prothorax and elytra. Four spines project from the metanotum, and the elytra contains a row of ten spines along lateral margins, and nine dorsolateral spines.

== Distribution ==
Discladispa armigera is known to be widespread in the following countries: Bangladesh, India, and Laos. Additionally, D. armigera is present, but not wide-spread in: Bhutan, Cambodia, China, Indonesia, Iran, Korea, Malaysia, Myanmar, Nepal, Pakistan, Philippines, Sri Lanka, Taiwan, Thailand, Vietnam, and Papua New Guinea.

== Mating behavior ==
The high reproductive potential and short generation time are significant contributors to the success of this species. Adults mate for the first time after 3–7 days. Mating is a complex and precisely determined process. Precopulatory behavior, including courtship, mounting, and activation of the female last a few seconds to a few minutes. Copulation requires ~1 hour. Postcopulatory behaviors are brief.

== Human interaction ==
D. armigera are known to cause significant plant damage, targeting crops such as rice, maize, and other grasses. Young plants are more susceptible to damage by the pests. The reduction of D. armigera populations in areas where crops are grown is desirable to increase crop yield. The two primary methods for population control are biological controls which utilize predators of the pest, and chemical controls which utilize insecticides. In some cases manual controls may be used.

=== Biological control ===
Several species have been explored as a biological control, including the egg parasitoid wasp Trichigramma zahiri Polaszek, the egg and larval parasitoid Neochrysocharis sp., and the larval and pupal parasitoid Scutibracon hispae. These hymenopteran species are natural parasitoids of the pre-adult stages of D. armigera.

The white muscardine fungus (Beauveria bassiana) has also been tested as a biological control of the rice hispa. On adherence to the body surface, the fungal spores germinate and enter into the beetle's haemocoel, where the fungus utilizes the body tissues for food. In field tests, the application of B. bassiana spores was effective in reducing D. armigera populations. Adult rice hispa die 5–6 days after inoculation, and white mycelial growth was observed over the surface of the insect. Infected adults become adhered to leaf surfaces, and after 7–10 days the entire surface of the adults is covered by the fungus. Infected eggs have a white powdery mass around it, surrounded by a yellow halo. Infected larvae become thinner, but do not change in length. Infected pupae had white mycelial growth over their body, their size is reduced by half and they become totally deformed.

=== Chemical control ===
Multiple biopesticides have been tested on D. armigera. Larvocel, Calpaste, Azacel, Neem oil, Multineem, and dk-bioneem have all been shown to be effective at reducing D. armigera populations by as much as 96%. Conventional pesticides are also effective, reducing D. armigera populations on experimental rice paddies by as much as 100%.
