= Dicladispa antennalis =

Scientific classification
- Kingdom: Animalia
- Phylum: Arthropoda
- Class: Insecta
- Order: Coleoptera
- Suborder: Polyphaga
- Infraorder: Cucujiformia
- Family: Chrysomelidae
- Genus: Dicladispa
- Species: D. antennalis

Binomial name
- Dicladispa antennalis (Kraatz, 1895)

Synonyms
- Hispa antennalis Kraatz, 1895

Species of beetle

Dicladispa antennalis is a species of beetle of the family Chrysomelidae. It is found in Cameroon, Congo, Guinea, Nigeria, Togo and Uganda.

== Life history ==
No host plant has been documented for this species.
