= Dicladispa distincta =

Scientific classification
- Kingdom: Animalia
- Phylum: Arthropoda
- Class: Insecta
- Order: Coleoptera
- Suborder: Polyphaga
- Infraorder: Cucujiformia
- Family: Chrysomelidae
- Genus: Dicladispa
- Species: D. distincta

Binomial name
- Dicladispa distincta (Ritsema, 1875)

Synonyms
- Hispa distincta Ritsema, 1875

Species of beetle

Dicladispa distincta is a species of beetle of the family Chrysomelidae. It is found in New Guinea.

== Life history ==
No host plant has been documented for this species.
