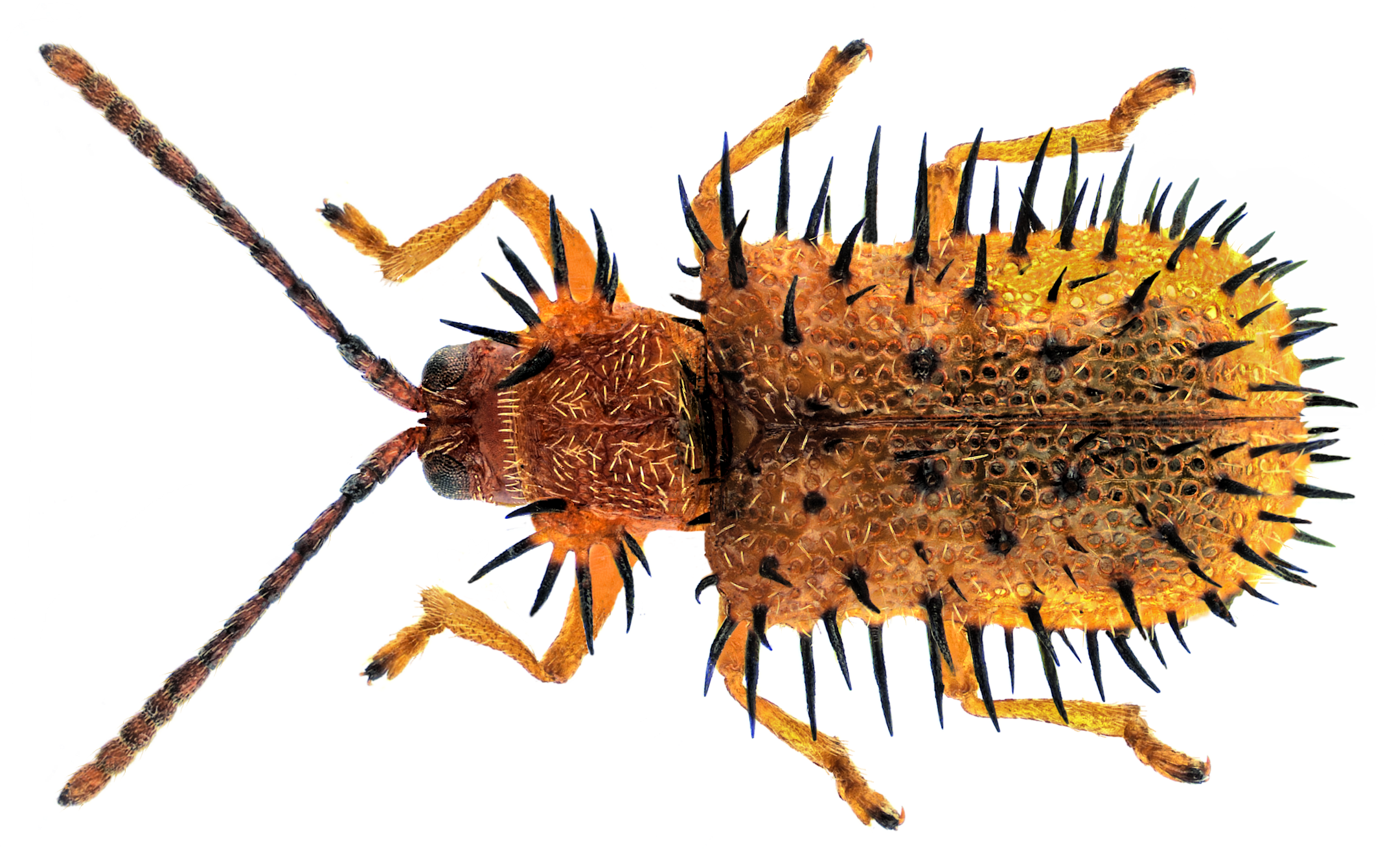

Scientific classification
- Kingdom: Animalia
- Phylum: Arthropoda
- Clade: Pancrustacea
- Class: Insecta
- Order: Coleoptera
- Suborder: Polyphaga
- Infraorder: Cucujiformia
- Family: Chrysomelidae
- Genus: Dicladispa
- Species: D. testacea

Binomial name
- Dicladispa testacea (Linnaeus, 1767)

Synonyms
- Hispa testacea Linnaeus, 1767; Hispa algeriana Guérin-Méneville, 1841; Hispa numida Guérin-Méneville, 1841

= Dicladispa testacea =

Species of beetle

Dicladispa testacea, also known as the prickly rockrose leaf beetle, is a species of leaf beetle.

== Description ==
Dicladispa testacea is a brownish orange beetle, with an exoskeleton covered in black spines. Mature individuals can reach a length of around 5mm long. This species produces yellowish-white, oval-shaped eggs. The female beetle bores a hole into the underside of a host plant leaf, where it will then lay up to two eggs. The larvae of Dicladispa testacea are herbivorous, feeding on the leaves of the host plant and producing leaf mines.

== Distribution ==
Dicladispa testacea is distributed across much of Europe and the eastern Mediterranean. In Europe the species has been recorded to live in Albania, Bulgaria, Croatia, France, Greece, Italy, Portugal, Spain, Switzerland, Serbia and Montenegro, the United Kingdom and Turkey. In Asia the species has been recorded to live in Cyprus, Israel, Lebanon, Syria and Turkey. In North Africa the species has been recorded to live in Algeria, Morocco and Tunisia.

== Habitat ==
Dicladispa testacea is monophagous, feeding exclusively on plants within the family Cistaceae, particularly species within the genus Cistus and Helianthemum. This species can occasionally be found inhabiting gardens where its host plants are cultivated for ornamental purposes.
