= Dicladispa gracilicornis =

Scientific classification
- Kingdom: Animalia
- Phylum: Arthropoda
- Class: Insecta
- Order: Coleoptera
- Suborder: Polyphaga
- Infraorder: Cucujiformia
- Family: Chrysomelidae
- Genus: Dicladispa
- Species: D. gracilicornis

Binomial name
- Dicladispa gracilicornis (Weise, 1905)

Synonyms
- Hispa gracilicornis Weise, 1905

Species of beetle

Dicladispa gracilicornis is a species of beetle of the family Chrysomelidae. It is found in Cameroon, Equatorial Guinea, Guinea, Guinea-Bissau, Nigeria, Togo and Zambia.

== Life history ==
No host plant has been documented for this species.
