= Dicladispa hebes =

Scientific classification
- Kingdom: Animalia
- Phylum: Arthropoda
- Class: Insecta
- Order: Coleoptera
- Suborder: Polyphaga
- Infraorder: Cucujiformia
- Family: Chrysomelidae
- Genus: Dicladispa
- Species: D. hebes

Binomial name
- Dicladispa hebes Uhmann, 1956

Species of beetle

Dicladispa hebes is a species of beetle of the family Chrysomelidae. It is found in Congo, Rwanda and South Africa.

== Life history ==
The recorded host plants for this species are Crotalaria species.
