= Dicladispa fallax =

Scientific classification
- Kingdom: Animalia
- Phylum: Arthropoda
- Class: Insecta
- Order: Coleoptera
- Suborder: Polyphaga
- Infraorder: Cucujiformia
- Family: Chrysomelidae
- Genus: Dicladispa
- Species: D. fallax

Binomial name
- Dicladispa fallax (Uhmann, 1930)

Synonyms
- Hispa fallax Uhmann, 1930; Dicladispa fallax subfallax Uhmann, 1954

Species of beetle

Dicladispa fallax is a species of beetle of the family Chrysomelidae. It is found in Congo, Nigeria and Tanzania.

== Life history ==
No host plant has been documented for this species.
