= Dicladispa lettowi =

Scientific classification
- Kingdom: Animalia
- Phylum: Arthropoda
- Class: Insecta
- Order: Coleoptera
- Suborder: Polyphaga
- Infraorder: Cucujiformia
- Family: Chrysomelidae
- Genus: Dicladispa
- Species: D. lettowi

Binomial name
- Dicladispa lettowi (Uhmann, 1928)

Synonyms
- Hispa lettowi Uhmann, 1928

Species of beetle

Dicladispa lettowi is a species of beetle of the family Chrysomelidae. It is found in Nigeria, South Africa, Tanzania and Zambia.

== Life history ==
No host plant has been documented for this species.
