= Dicladispa aerea =

Scientific classification
- Kingdom: Animalia
- Phylum: Arthropoda
- Class: Insecta
- Order: Coleoptera
- Suborder: Polyphaga
- Infraorder: Cucujiformia
- Family: Chrysomelidae
- Genus: Dicladispa
- Species: D. aerea

Binomial name
- Dicladispa aerea (Gestro, 1897)

Synonyms
- Hispa (Dicladispa) aerea Gestro, 1897; Hispa belli Weise, 1897

Species of beetle

Dicladispa aerea is a species of beetle of the family Chrysomelidae. It is found in Bangladesh and India (Bengal, Bihar, Karnataka, Madras, Maharashtra, Mysore, Orissa).

== Life history ==
No host plant has been documented for this species.
