= Dicladispa burgeoni =

Scientific classification
- Kingdom: Animalia
- Phylum: Arthropoda
- Class: Insecta
- Order: Coleoptera
- Suborder: Polyphaga
- Infraorder: Cucujiformia
- Family: Chrysomelidae
- Genus: Dicladispa
- Species: D. burgeoni

Binomial name
- Dicladispa burgeoni (Uhmann, 1936)

Synonyms
- Hispa burgeoni Uhmann, 1936

Species of beetle

Dicladispa burgeoni is a species of beetle of the family Chrysomelidae. It is found in the Democratic Republic of the Congo and Uganda.

== Life history ==
No host plant has been documented for this species.
