= Dicladispa ornata =

Scientific classification
- Kingdom: Animalia
- Phylum: Arthropoda
- Class: Insecta
- Order: Coleoptera
- Suborder: Polyphaga
- Infraorder: Cucujiformia
- Family: Chrysomelidae
- Genus: Dicladispa
- Species: D. ornata

Binomial name
- Dicladispa ornata (Uhmann, 1939)

Synonyms
- Hispa ornata Uhmann, 1939

Species of beetle

Dicladispa ornata is a species of beetle of the family Chrysomelidae. It is found in Congo and Uganda.

== Life history ==
The recorded host plant for this species is Grewia flavenscens.
