= Dicladispa delicata =

Scientific classification
- Kingdom: Animalia
- Phylum: Arthropoda
- Class: Insecta
- Order: Coleoptera
- Suborder: Polyphaga
- Infraorder: Cucujiformia
- Family: Chrysomelidae
- Genus: Dicladispa
- Species: D. delicata

Binomial name
- Dicladispa delicata (Péringuey, 1898)

Synonyms
- Hispa delicata Péringuey, 1898; Dicladispa belliana Gestro, 1899

Species of beetle

Dicladispa delicata is a species of beetle of the family Chrysomelidae. It is found in Eritrea and South Africa.

== Life history ==
No host plant has been documented for this species.
