= Dicladispa laevigata =

Scientific classification
- Kingdom: Animalia
- Phylum: Arthropoda
- Class: Insecta
- Order: Coleoptera
- Suborder: Polyphaga
- Infraorder: Cucujiformia
- Family: Chrysomelidae
- Genus: Dicladispa
- Species: D. laevigata

Binomial name
- Dicladispa laevigata (Uhmann, 1937)

Synonyms
- Hispa laevigata Uhmann, 1937

Species of beetle

Dicladispa laevigata is a species of beetle of the family Chrysomelidae. It is found in Congo and Tanzania.

== Life history ==
No host plant has been documented for this species.
