= Dicladispa quadrifida =

Scientific classification
- Kingdom: Animalia
- Phylum: Arthropoda
- Class: Insecta
- Order: Coleoptera
- Suborder: Polyphaga
- Infraorder: Cucujiformia
- Family: Chrysomelidae
- Genus: Dicladispa
- Species: D. quadrifida

Binomial name
- Dicladispa quadrifida (Gerstäcker, 1871)

Synonyms
- Hispa quadrifida Gerstäcker, 1871; Hispa goetzeni Uhmann, 1928; Hispa zanzibarica Donckier, 1899

Species of beetle

Dicladispa quadrifida is a species of beetle of the family Chrysomelidae. It is found in Congo, Mozambique, South Africa, Tanzania, Zimbabwe and Kenya.

== Life history ==
No host plant has been documented for this species.
