= Dicladispa subhirta =

Scientific classification
- Kingdom: Animalia
- Phylum: Arthropoda
- Class: Insecta
- Order: Coleoptera
- Suborder: Polyphaga
- Infraorder: Cucujiformia
- Family: Chrysomelidae
- Genus: Dicladispa
- Species: D. subhirta

Binomial name
- Dicladispa subhirta (Chapuis, 1877)

Synonyms
- Hispa subhirta Chapuis, 1877

Species of beetle

Dicladispa subhirta is a species of beetle of the family Chrysomelidae. It is found in Madagascar.

== Life history ==
No host plant has been documented for this species.
