= Dicladispa dama =

Scientific classification
- Kingdom: Animalia
- Phylum: Arthropoda
- Class: Insecta
- Order: Coleoptera
- Suborder: Polyphaga
- Infraorder: Cucujiformia
- Family: Chrysomelidae
- Genus: Dicladispa
- Species: D. dama

Binomial name
- Dicladispa dama (Chapuis, 1877)

Synonyms
- Hispa dama Chapuis, 1877; Hispa abdominalis Baly, 1888

Species of beetle

Dicladispa dama is a species of beetle of the family Chrysomelidae. It is found in India (Assam, Uttar Pradesh) and Myanmar.

== Life history ==
The recorded host plants for this species are Malus and Rosa species, as well as Oryza sativa.
