= Dicladispa mombonensis =

Scientific classification
- Kingdom: Animalia
- Phylum: Arthropoda
- Class: Insecta
- Order: Coleoptera
- Suborder: Polyphaga
- Infraorder: Cucujiformia
- Family: Chrysomelidae
- Genus: Dicladispa
- Species: D. mombonensis

Binomial name
- Dicladispa mombonensis (Weise, 1899)

Synonyms
- Hispa mombonensis Weise, 1899

Species of beetle

Dicladispa mombonensis is a species of beetle of the family Chrysomelidae. It is found in Kenya and Mozambique.

== Life history ==
No host plant has been documented for this species.
