= Dicladispa kapauku =

Scientific classification
- Kingdom: Animalia
- Phylum: Arthropoda
- Class: Insecta
- Order: Coleoptera
- Suborder: Polyphaga
- Infraorder: Cucujiformia
- Family: Chrysomelidae
- Genus: Dicladispa
- Species: D. kapauku

Binomial name
- Dicladispa kapauku Gressitt, 1957

Synonyms
- Dicladispa linnei Gressitt, 1957 (not Weise)

Species of beetle

Dicladispa kapauku is a species of beetle of the family Chrysomelidae. It is found in New Guinea.

== Life history ==
The recorded host plants for this species are grasses (Poaceae).
