= Dicladispa deserticola =

Scientific classification
- Kingdom: Animalia
- Phylum: Arthropoda
- Class: Insecta
- Order: Coleoptera
- Suborder: Polyphaga
- Infraorder: Cucujiformia
- Family: Chrysomelidae
- Genus: Dicladispa
- Species: D. deserticola

Binomial name
- Dicladispa deserticola (Weise, 1900)

Synonyms
- Hispa deserticola Weise, 1900; Dicladispa peringueyi Gestro, 1906

Species of beetle

Dicladispa deserticola is a species of beetle of the family Chrysomelidae. It is found in Cameroon, Congo and Zimbabwe.

== Life history ==
No host plant has been documented for this species.
