= Dicladispa lulengaica =

Scientific classification
- Kingdom: Animalia
- Phylum: Arthropoda
- Class: Insecta
- Order: Coleoptera
- Suborder: Polyphaga
- Infraorder: Cucujiformia
- Family: Chrysomelidae
- Genus: Dicladispa
- Species: D. lulengaica

Binomial name
- Dicladispa lulengaica (Uhmann, 1930)

Synonyms
- Hispa lulengaica Uhmann, 1930

Species of beetle

Dicladispa lulengaica is a species of beetle of the family Chrysomelidae. It is found in Congo and Uganda.

== Life history ==
No host plant has been documented for this species.
