= Dicladispa fabricii =

Scientific classification
- Kingdom: Animalia
- Phylum: Arthropoda
- Clade: Pancrustacea
- Class: Insecta
- Order: Coleoptera
- Suborder: Polyphaga
- Infraorder: Cucujiformia
- Family: Chrysomelidae
- Genus: Dicladispa
- Species: D. fabricii

Binomial name
- Dicladispa fabricii (Guérin-Méneville, 1830)

Synonyms
- Hispa fabricii Guérin-Méneville, 1830; Hispa linnei Weise, 1905

Species of beetle

Dicladispa fabricii is a species of beetle of the family Chrysomelidae. It is found on the Bismarck Islands, as well as in Indonesia, New Guinea and the Solomon Islands (Bougainville, New Britain, New Ireland).

== Description ==
Larvae are whitish testaceous, but slightly ochraceous on the anterior and postmedian portions of the head capsule and on the central portion of the pronotum. They reach a length of about 4.5 mm.

== Life history ==
The recorded host plants for this species are various grasses (including Oplismenus species) and Zea mays. The larvae mine between the upper and lower surfaces of the leaves of their host plant. Pupation also takes place here.
