= Dicladispa aurichalcea =

Scientific classification
- Kingdom: Animalia
- Phylum: Arthropoda
- Class: Insecta
- Order: Coleoptera
- Suborder: Polyphaga
- Infraorder: Cucujiformia
- Family: Chrysomelidae
- Genus: Dicladispa
- Species: D. aurichalcea

Binomial name
- Dicladispa aurichalcea (Weise, 1904)

Synonyms
- Hispa aurichalcea Weise, 1904

Species of beetle

Dicladispa aurichalcea is a species of beetle of the family Chrysomelidae. It is found in Congo and Tanzania.

== Life history ==
No host plant has been documented for this species.
