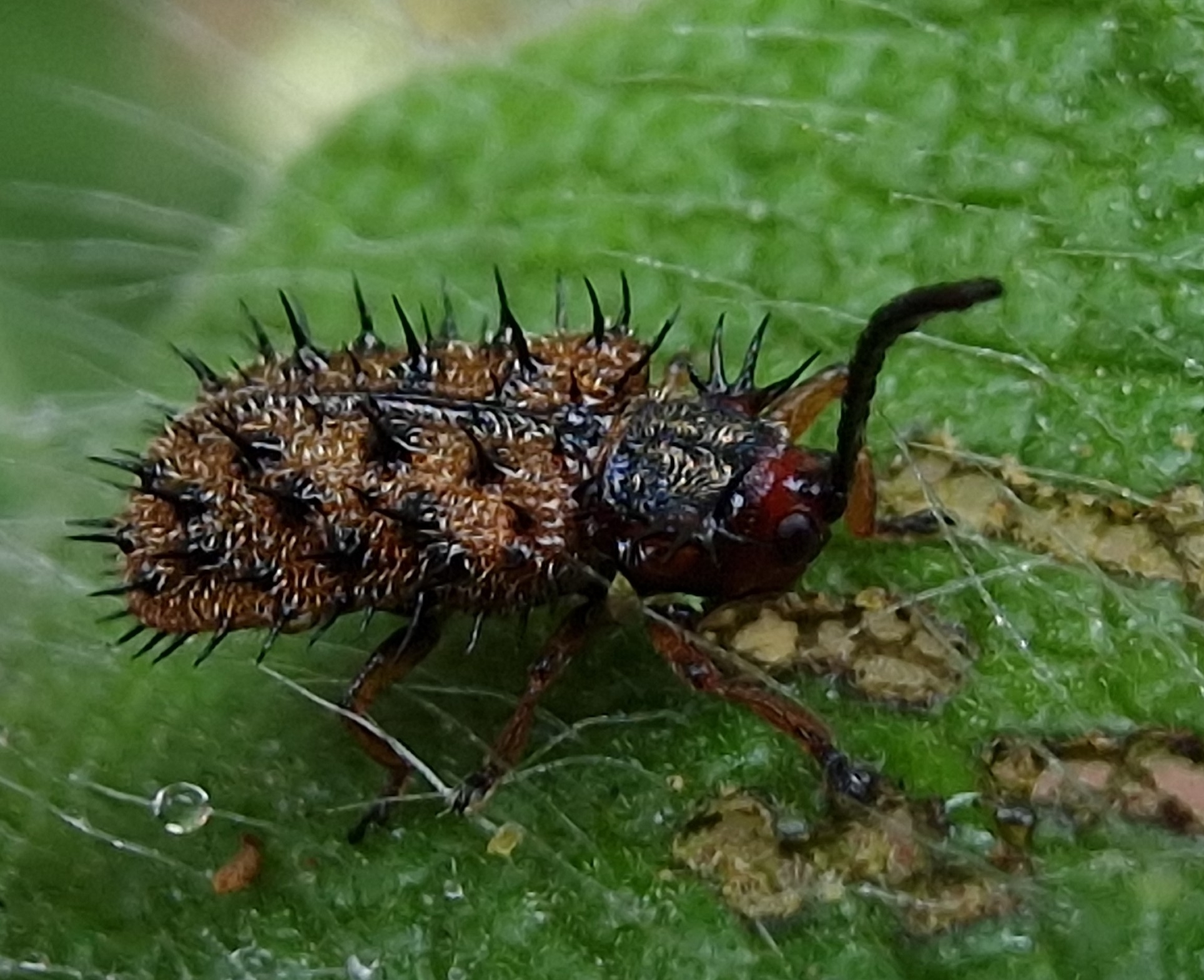

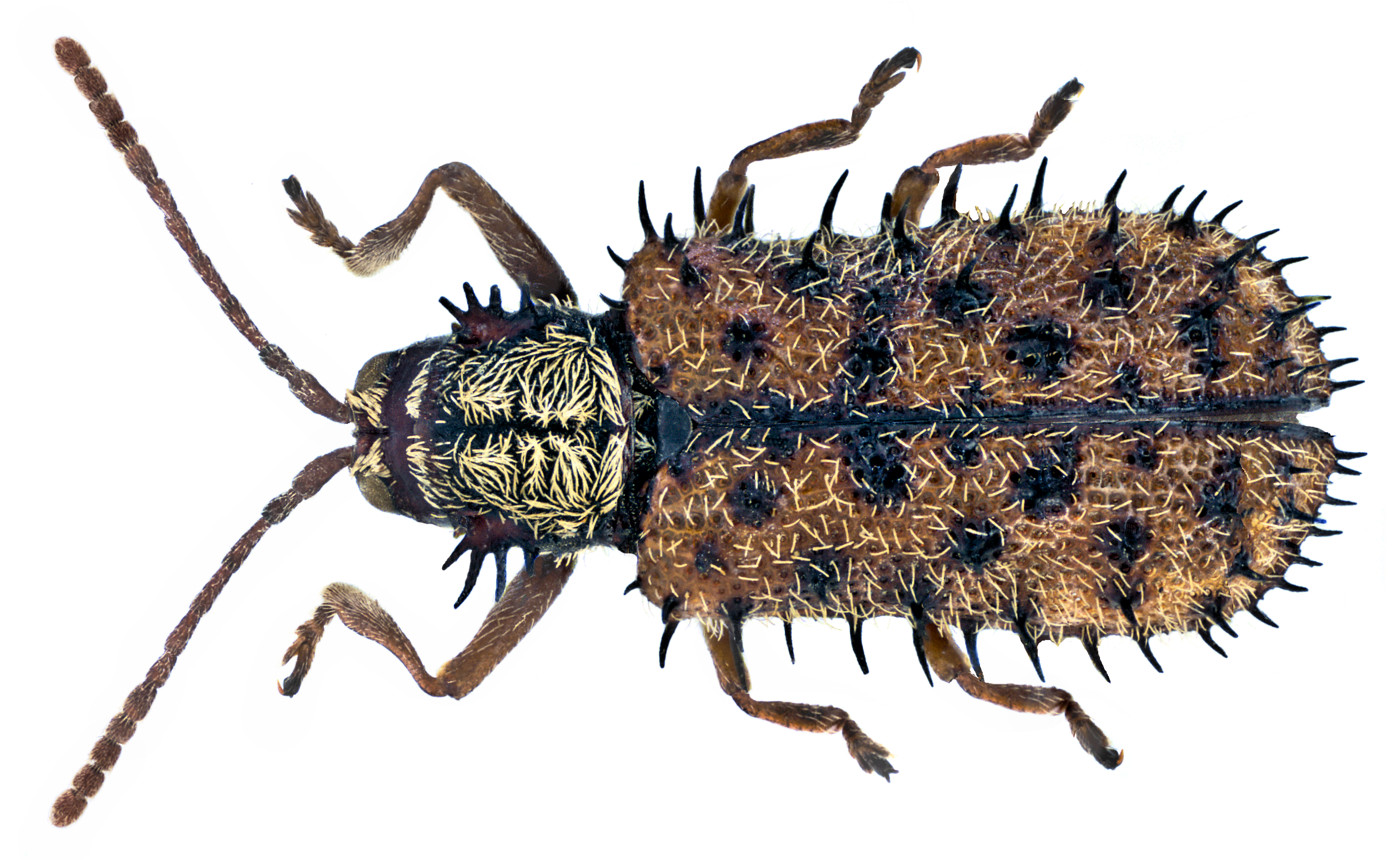

Scientific classification
- Kingdom: Animalia
- Phylum: Arthropoda
- Class: Insecta
- Order: Coleoptera
- Suborder: Polyphaga
- Infraorder: Cucujiformia
- Family: Chrysomelidae
- Genus: Dicladispa
- Species: D. occator

Binomial name
- Dicladispa occator (Brullé, 1838)

Synonyms
- Hispa occator Brullé, 1838

= Dicladispa occator =

Species of beetle

Dicladispa occator is a species of beetle of the family Chrysomelidae. It is found on the Canary Islands.

== Life history ==
The recorded host plant for this species is Cistus vaginalis.
