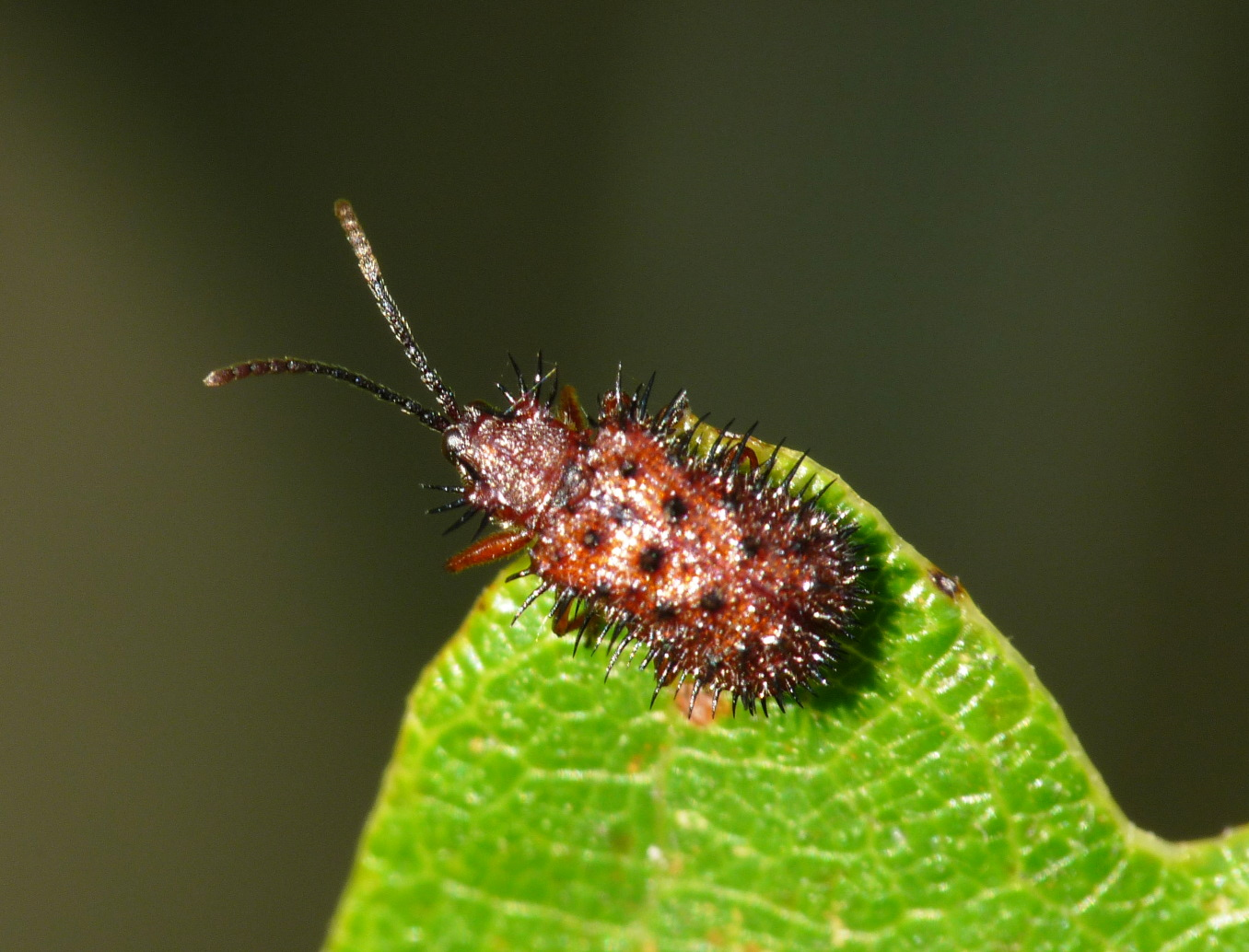
- Dicladispa testacea

Scientific classification
- Kingdom: Animalia
- Phylum: Arthropoda
- Clade: Pancrustacea
- Class: Insecta
- Order: Coleoptera
- Suborder: Polyphaga
- Infraorder: Cucujiformia
- Family: Chrysomelidae
- Tribe: Hispini
- Genus: Dicladispa; Gestro, 1897

Synonyms
- Brachispa Gestro, 1906; Decispa Uhmann, 1928; Eutrichispa Gestro, 1923; Cirrispa Uhmann 1940

= Dicladispa =

Genus of leaf beetles

Dicladispa is a genus of beetles belonging to the family Chrysomelidae; it was erected by Raffaello Gestro in 1897.

The species of this genus are found in Africa, Southern Europe and Southeastern Asia. D. armigera is the "rice hispa": an agricultural pest.

== Species ==
The following are included in BioLib.cz:

Subgenus Decispa Uhmann, 1928

1. Dicladispa meyeri Uhmann, 1928

Subgenus Dicladispa

1. Dicladispa admiranda Uhmann, 1950
2. Dicladispa aerea (Gestro, 1897)
3. Dicladispa aereipennis (Uhmann, 1930)
4. Dicladispa alluaudi Gestro, 1914
5. Dicladispa alternata (Chapuis, 1877)
6. Dicladispa antennalis (Kraatz)
7. Dicladispa approximata Péringuey, 1908
8. Dicladispa arebiana (Uhmann, 1930)
9. Dicladispa armigera (Olivier, 1808)
10. Dicladispa armispina (Kraatz, 1895)
11. Dicladispa aucta Uhmann, 1954
12. Dicladispa aurichalcea (Weise, 1904)
13. Dicladispa balli (Uhmann, 1930)
14. Dicladispa basongoana (Uhmann, 1930)
15. Dicladispa bennigseni (Weise, 1899)
16. Dicladispa burgeoni (Uhmann, 1936)
17. Dicladispa caffra (Weise, 1904)
18. Dicladispa comata (Weise, 1922)
19. Dicladispa compacta Gestro, 1908
20. Dicladispa congoana (Weise, 1901)
21. Dicladispa crassa Uhmann, 1954
22. Dicladispa cyannipennis (Motschulsky, 1861)
23. Dicladispa dama (Chapuis, 1877)
24. Dicladispa decipiens (Péringuey, 1898)
25. Dicladispa delicata (Péringuey, 1898)
26. Dicladispa densa Uhmann, 1961
27. Dicladispa desaegeri Uhmann, 1961
28. Dicladispa deserticola (Weise, 1900)
29. Dicladispa distincta (Ritsema, 1875)
30. Dicladispa dorsalis Péringuey, 1908
31. Dicladispa exasperans Péringuey, 1908
32. Dicladispa eximia (Péringuey, 1898)
33. Dicladispa exquistia (Uhmann, 1931)
34. Dicladispa fabricii (Guérin-Méneville, 1830)
35. Dicladispa fallaciosa (Péringuey, 1898)
36. Dicladispa fallax (Uhmann, 1930)
37. Dicladispa faucium Uhmann, 1954
38. Dicladispa femorata (Fairmaire, 1888)
39. Dicladispa flabellata Uhmann, 1954
40. Dicladispa formosa (Gestro, 1906)
41. Dicladispa fraterna Péringuey, 1908
42. Dicladispa freyi Uhmann, 1961
43. Dicladispa gestroi (Chapuis, 1877)
44. Dicladispa gracilicornis (Weise, 1905)
45. Dicladispa haafi Uhmann, 1961
46. Dicladispa hastata Uhmann, 1954
47. Dicladispa hebes Uhmann, 1956
48. Dicladispa indubia Péringuey, 1908
49. Dicladispa iranica Lopatin, 1984
50. Dicladispa jeannelii Gestro, 1914
51. Dicladispa joliveti Uhmann, 1953
52. Dicladispa kapauku Gressitt, 1957
53. Dicladispa kapiriensis (Uhmann, 1930)
54. Dicladispa katentaniana (Uhmann, 1930)
55. Dicladispa keiseri Uhmann, 1960
56. Dicladispa kivuensis (Uhmann, 1930)
57. Dicladispa kraatzi (Weise, 1897)
58. Dicladispa laevigata (Uhmann, 1937)
59. Dicladispa lanigera (Péringuey, 1898)
60. Dicladispa lenicornis Gestro, 1911
61. Dicladispa lettowi (Uhmann, 1928)
62. Dicladispa longispinosa (Fairmaire, 1869)
63. Dicladispa lulengaica (Uhmann, 1930)
64. Dicladispa lusingana Uhmann, 1954
65. Dicladispa machadoi Uhmann, 1957
66. Dicladispa madegassa (Pic, 1932)
67. Dicladispa malvernia Péringuey, 1908
68. Dicladispa marginata (Uhmann, 1930)
69. Dicladispa megacantha (Gestro, 1890)
70. Dicladispa melancholica (Weise, 1901)
71. Dicladispa mombonensis (Weise, 1899)
72. Dicladispa multispinosa (Gestro, 1906)
73. Dicladispa nigra (Uhmann, 1928)
74. Dicladispa obliqua Uhmann, 1954
75. Dicladispa obscura Gestro, 1908
76. Dicladispa occator (Brullé, 1838)
77. Dicladispa omarramba (Péringuey, 1898)
78. Dicladispa opaca (Weise, 1904)
79. Dicladispa opacicollis (Uhmann, 1930)
80. Dicladispa ornata (Uhmann, 1939)
81. Dicladispa ovampoa (Péringuey, 1898)
82. Dicladispa pallescens (Guérin-Méneville, 1841)
83. Dicladispa pallidicornis Gestro, 1907
84. Dicladispa palmata Uhmann, 1961
85. Dicladispa parvula Uhmann, 1960
86. Dicladispa pembertoni Gressitt, 1957
87. Dicladispa perplexa (Péringuey, 1898)
88. Dicladispa pilosula Gestro, 1914
89. Dicladispa platyclada (Gestro, 1906)
90. Dicladispa poeciloptera Gestro, 1906
91. Dicladispa propinqua Uhmann, 1958
92. Dicladispa proxima (Weise, 1910)
93. Dicladispa quadrifida (Gerstäcker, 1871)
94. Dicladispa radiatilis (Uhmann, 1930)
95. Dicladispa ramifera (Uhmann, 1928)
96. Dicladispa ramulosa (Chapuis, 1877)
97. Dicladispa rhodesiaca Uhmann, 1954
98. Dicladispa romani (Uhmann, 1935)
99. Dicladispa saga Gestro, 1908
100. Dicladispa scutellata Uhmann, 1958
101. Dicladispa sebakuena Péringuey, 1908
102. Dicladispa spiculata Uhmann, 1957
103. Dicladispa spinifera (Uhmann, 1935)
104. Dicladispa spinosissima (Gestro, 1909)
105. Dicladispa straeleni Uhmann, 1954
106. Dicladispa straminea (Péringuey, 1898)
107. Dicladispa striaticollis (Gestro, 1906)
108. Dicladispa stuhlmanni (Uhmann, 1928)
109. Dicladispa subhirta (Chapuis, 1877)
110. Dicladispa tenuispina Gestro, 1906
111. Dicladispa terribilis Demaux, 1965
112. Dicladispa testacea (Linnaeus, 1767)
113. Dicladispa torulosa (Chapuis, 1877)
114. Dicladispa traversii Gestro, 1906
115. Dicladispa triramosa Gestro, 1908
116. Dicladispa trux Uhmann, 1954
117. Dicladispa uhmanniella Demaux, 1963
118. Dicladispa usambarica (Weise, 1898)
119. Dicladispa varii Uhmann, 1957
120. Dicladispa vexatrix (Péringuey, 1898)
121. Dicladispa vicinalis (Péringuey, 1898)

Subgenus Eutrichispa Gestro, 1923

1. Dicladispa crispa Uhmann, 1930
2. Dicladispa gebieni Uhmann, 1930
3. Dicladispa schoutedeni (Gestro, 1923)

== Unplaced taxa ==
- Dicladispa capensis (Thunberg, 1784) (described as Hispa capensis from an unknown locality. The depository of the holotype is unknown)

== Fossil species ==
- †Dicladispa beskonakensis Nel, 1988 (type: Turkey, Anatoil, Bes-Konak, MNHN)
- †Dicladispa muratensis Nel, 1988 (type: France, Sainte-Reine, MNHN)
