= Dicladispa proxima =

Scientific classification
- Kingdom: Animalia
- Phylum: Arthropoda
- Class: Insecta
- Order: Coleoptera
- Suborder: Polyphaga
- Infraorder: Cucujiformia
- Family: Chrysomelidae
- Genus: Dicladispa
- Species: D. proxima

Binomial name
- Dicladispa proxima (Weise, 1910)

Synonyms
- Hispa proxima Weise, 1910

Species of beetle

Dicladispa proxima is a species of beetle of the family Chrysomelidae. It is found in Angola, Congo, Tanzania, Uganda and Zimbabwe.

== Life history ==
No host plant has been documented for this species.
