= Dicladispa kraatzi =

Scientific classification
- Kingdom: Animalia
- Phylum: Arthropoda
- Class: Insecta
- Order: Coleoptera
- Suborder: Polyphaga
- Infraorder: Cucujiformia
- Family: Chrysomelidae
- Genus: Dicladispa
- Species: D. kraatzi

Binomial name
- Dicladispa kraatzi (Weise, 1897)

Synonyms
- Hispa kraatzi Weise, 1897

Species of beetle

Dicladispa kraatzi is a species of beetle of the family Chrysomelidae. It is found in Angola, Cameroon, Congo, Guinea, Nigeria, Rwanda, Senegal, Togo and Uganda.

== Life history ==
No host plant has been documented for this species.
