= Dicladispa torulosa =

Scientific classification
- Kingdom: Animalia
- Phylum: Arthropoda
- Class: Insecta
- Order: Coleoptera
- Suborder: Polyphaga
- Infraorder: Cucujiformia
- Family: Chrysomelidae
- Genus: Dicladispa
- Species: D. torulosa

Binomial name
- Dicladispa torulosa (Chapuis, 1877)

Synonyms
- Hispa torulosa Chapuis, 1877

Species of beetle

Dicladispa torulosa is a species of beetle of the family Chrysomelidae. It is found in Congo, Kenya, Mozambique, South Africa, Tanzania and Uganda.

== Life history ==
No host plant has been documented for this species.
