= Dicladispa opacicollis =

Scientific classification
- Kingdom: Animalia
- Phylum: Arthropoda
- Class: Insecta
- Order: Coleoptera
- Suborder: Polyphaga
- Infraorder: Cucujiformia
- Family: Chrysomelidae
- Genus: Dicladispa
- Species: D. opacicollis

Binomial name
- Dicladispa opacicollis (Uhmann, 1930)

Synonyms
- Hispa opacicollis Uhmann, 1930

Species of beetle

Dicladispa opacicollis is a species of beetle of the family Chrysomelidae. It is found in Angola, Congo, Kenya and Rwanda.

== Life history ==
Collart reported Mûrier du Cap as the host plant in 1934.
