= Dicladispa schoutedeni =

Scientific classification
- Kingdom: Animalia
- Phylum: Arthropoda
- Class: Insecta
- Order: Coleoptera
- Suborder: Polyphaga
- Infraorder: Cucujiformia
- Family: Chrysomelidae
- Genus: Dicladispa
- Species: D. schoutedeni

Binomial name
- Dicladispa schoutedeni (Gestro, 1923)

Synonyms
- Thoracispa schoutedeni Gestro, 1923

Species of beetle

Dicladispa schoutedeni is a species of beetle of the family Chrysomelidae. It is found in Kenya.

== Life history ==
No host plant has been documented for this species.
