= Dicladispa melancholica =

Scientific classification
- Kingdom: Animalia
- Phylum: Arthropoda
- Class: Insecta
- Order: Coleoptera
- Suborder: Polyphaga
- Infraorder: Cucujiformia
- Family: Chrysomelidae
- Genus: Dicladispa
- Species: D. melancholica

Binomial name
- Dicladispa melancholica (Weise, 1901)

Synonyms
- Hispa melancholica Weise, 1901

Species of beetle

Dicladispa melancholica is a species of beetle of the family Chrysomelidae. It is found in Kenya, Congo, Tanzania and Zimbabwe.

== Life history ==
No host plant has been documented for this species.
