= Dicladispa basongoana =

Scientific classification
- Kingdom: Animalia
- Phylum: Arthropoda
- Class: Insecta
- Order: Coleoptera
- Suborder: Polyphaga
- Infraorder: Cucujiformia
- Family: Chrysomelidae
- Genus: Dicladispa
- Species: D. basongoana

Binomial name
- Dicladispa basongoana (Uhmann, 1930)

Synonyms
- Hispa basongoana Uhmann, 1930

Species of beetle

Dicladispa basongoana is a species of beetle of the family Chrysomelidae. It is found in the Democratic Republic of the Congo and Tanzania.

== Life history ==
No host plant has been documented for this species.
