= Dicladispa pallescens =

Scientific classification
- Kingdom: Animalia
- Phylum: Arthropoda
- Class: Insecta
- Order: Coleoptera
- Suborder: Polyphaga
- Infraorder: Cucujiformia
- Family: Chrysomelidae
- Genus: Dicladispa
- Species: D. pallescens

Binomial name
- Dicladispa pallescens (Guérin-Méneville, 1841)

Synonyms
- Hispa pallescens Guérin-Méneville, 1841; Hispa pallida Guérin-Méneville, 1841; Hispa pavida Weise, 1901; Hispa holtzi Uhmann, 1928

Species of beetle

Dicladispa pallescens is a species of beetle of the family Chrysomelidae. It is found in Angola, Congo, Egypt, Eritrea, Ethiopia, India (Bihar, Pondicherry, Punjab, Madhya Pradesh), Kenya, Malawi, Mozambique, Nigeria, Saudi Arabia, Senegal, South Africa, Tanzania, Yemen and Zimbabwe.

== Life history ==
The recorded host plants for this species are Triumfetta rotundifolia and Abutilon species.
