= Dicladispa cyannipennis =

Scientific classification
- Kingdom: Animalia
- Phylum: Arthropoda
- Class: Insecta
- Order: Coleoptera
- Suborder: Polyphaga
- Infraorder: Cucujiformia
- Family: Chrysomelidae
- Genus: Dicladispa
- Species: D. cyannipennis

Binomial name
- Dicladispa cyannipennis (Motschulsky, 1861)

Synonyms
- Hispa cyannipennis Motschulsky, 1861

Species of beetle

Dicladispa cyannipennis is a species of beetle of the family Chrysomelidae. It is found in India and Myanmar.

== Life history ==
The recorded host plants for this species are Sorghum species.
