= Dicladispa usambarica =

Scientific classification
- Kingdom: Animalia
- Phylum: Arthropoda
- Class: Insecta
- Order: Coleoptera
- Suborder: Polyphaga
- Infraorder: Cucujiformia
- Family: Chrysomelidae
- Genus: Dicladispa
- Species: D. usambarica

Binomial name
- Dicladispa usambarica (Weise, 1898)

Synonyms
- Hispa usambarica Weise, 1898

Species of beetle

Dicladispa usambarica is a species of beetle of the family Chrysomelidae. It is found in Congo, Guinea, Ivory Coast, Kenya, Nigeria and Senegal.

== Life history ==
The recorded host plant for this species is Oryza sativa.
