= Dicladispa comata =

Scientific classification
- Kingdom: Animalia
- Phylum: Arthropoda
- Class: Insecta
- Order: Coleoptera
- Suborder: Polyphaga
- Infraorder: Cucujiformia
- Family: Chrysomelidae
- Genus: Dicladispa
- Species: D. comata

Binomial name
- Dicladispa comata (Weise, 1922)

Synonyms
- Hispa comata Weise, 1922; Cirrispa conradsi Uhmann, 1940

Species of beetle

Dicladispa comata is a species of beetle of the family Chrysomelidae. It is found in Angola, Botswana, Congo, Egypt, Kenya, Senegal, Syria, Tanzania and Zimbabwe.

== Life history ==
No host plant has been documented for this species.
