= Dicladispa longespinosa =

Scientific classification
- Kingdom: Animalia
- Phylum: Arthropoda
- Class: Insecta
- Order: Coleoptera
- Suborder: Polyphaga
- Infraorder: Cucujiformia
- Family: Chrysomelidae
- Genus: Dicladispa
- Species: D. longespinosa

Binomial name
- Dicladispa longespinosa (Fairmaire, 1869)

Synonyms
- Hispa longispinosa Fairmaire, 1869; Hispa longespinosa atripes Pic, 1932

Species of beetle

Dicladispa longespinosa is a species of beetle of the family Chrysomelidae. It is found in Madagascar and Uganda.

== Life history ==
No host plant has been documented for this species.
