= Dicladispa eximia =

Scientific classification
- Kingdom: Animalia
- Phylum: Arthropoda
- Class: Insecta
- Order: Coleoptera
- Suborder: Polyphaga
- Infraorder: Cucujiformia
- Family: Chrysomelidae
- Genus: Dicladispa
- Species: D. eximia

Binomial name
- Dicladispa eximia (Péringuey, 1898)

Synonyms
- Hispa eximia Péringuey, 1898

Species of beetle

Dicladispa eximia is a species of beetle of the family Chrysomelidae. It is found in Congo, South Africa and Tanzania.

== Life history ==
No host plant has been documented for this species.
