= Dicladispa balli =

Scientific classification
- Kingdom: Animalia
- Phylum: Arthropoda
- Class: Insecta
- Order: Coleoptera
- Suborder: Polyphaga
- Infraorder: Cucujiformia
- Family: Chrysomelidae
- Genus: Dicladispa
- Species: D. balli

Binomial name
- Dicladispa balli (Uhmann, 1930)

Synonyms
- Hispa balli Uhmann, 1930

Species of beetle

Dicladispa balli is a species of beetle of the family Chrysomelidae. It is found in Angola, Congo and South Africa.

== Life history ==
No host plant has been documented for this species.
