= Dicladispa striaticollis =

Scientific classification
- Kingdom: Animalia
- Phylum: Arthropoda
- Class: Insecta
- Order: Coleoptera
- Suborder: Polyphaga
- Infraorder: Cucujiformia
- Family: Chrysomelidae
- Genus: Dicladispa
- Species: D. striaticollis

Binomial name
- Dicladispa striaticollis (Gestro, 1906)

Synonyms
- Hispa striaticollis Gestro, 1906; Hispa alutacea Uhmann, 1928

Species of beetle

Dicladispa striaticollis is a species of beetle of the family Chrysomelidae. It is found in Cameroon, Congo, Guinea, Niger, Nigeria, Rwanda, South Africa, Tanzania and Uganda.

== Life history ==
The recorded host plants for this species are Oryza sativa and Zea mays.
