= Dicladispa pallidicornis =

Scientific classification
- Kingdom: Animalia
- Phylum: Arthropoda
- Class: Insecta
- Order: Coleoptera
- Suborder: Polyphaga
- Infraorder: Cucujiformia
- Family: Chrysomelidae
- Genus: Dicladispa
- Species: D. pallidicornis

Binomial name
- Dicladispa pallidicornis (Gestro, 1907)

Synonyms
- Hispa pallidicornis Guérin-Méneville, 1841

Species of beetle

Dicladispa pallidicornis is a species of beetle of the family Chrysomelidae. It is found in Congo, Tanzania and Kenya.

== Life history ==
No host plant has been documented for this species.
