= Dicladispa omarramba =

Scientific classification
- Kingdom: Animalia
- Phylum: Arthropoda
- Class: Insecta
- Order: Coleoptera
- Suborder: Polyphaga
- Infraorder: Cucujiformia
- Family: Chrysomelidae
- Genus: Dicladispa
- Species: D. omarramba

Binomial name
- Dicladispa omarramba (Péringuey, 1898)

Synonyms
- Hispa omarramba Péringuey, 1898

Species of beetle

Dicladispa omarramba is a species of beetle of the family Chrysomelidae. It is found in Kenya, South Africa and Tanzania.

== Life history ==
No host plant has been documented for this species.
