= Dicladispa exasperans =

Scientific classification
- Kingdom: Animalia
- Phylum: Arthropoda
- Class: Insecta
- Order: Coleoptera
- Suborder: Polyphaga
- Infraorder: Cucujiformia
- Family: Chrysomelidae
- Genus: Dicladispa
- Species: D. exasperans

Binomial name
- Dicladispa exasperans (Péringuey, 1908)

Species of beetle

Dicladispa exasperans is a species of beetle of the family Chrysomelidae. It is found in South Africa.

== Life history ==
The recorded host plant for this species is Dalbergia obovata.
