= Dicladispa gestroi =

Scientific classification
- Kingdom: Animalia
- Phylum: Arthropoda
- Class: Insecta
- Order: Coleoptera
- Suborder: Polyphaga
- Infraorder: Cucujiformia
- Family: Chrysomelidae
- Genus: Dicladispa
- Species: D. gestroi

Binomial name
- Dicladispa gestroi (Chapuis, 1877)

Synonyms
- Hispa gestroi Chapuis, 1877

Species of beetle

Dicladispa gestroi is a species of beetle of the family Chrysomelidae. It is found in Madagascar.

== Life history ==
The recorded host plants for this species are Oryza sativa, Leerisa hexandra, Ageratum conyzoides, Echinochloa, Panicum, Eleocharis and Scripus species, as well as Pycreus mundii.
