= Dicladispa megacantha =

Scientific classification
- Kingdom: Animalia
- Phylum: Arthropoda
- Clade: Pancrustacea
- Class: Insecta
- Order: Coleoptera
- Suborder: Polyphaga
- Infraorder: Cucujiformia
- Family: Chrysomelidae
- Genus: Dicladispa
- Species: D. megacantha

Binomial name
- Dicladispa megacantha (Gestro, 1890)

Synonyms
- Hispa megacantha Gestro, 1890; Hispa birendra Maulik, 1919

Species of beetle

Dicladispa megacantha is a species of beetle of the family Chrysomelidae. It is found in Bangladesh, Bhutan, China (Yunnan), India (Assam, Meghalaya, Sikkim, West Bengal), Indonesia (Java), Laos, Myanmar, Thailand and Vietnam.

== Life history ==
No host plant has been documented for this species.
