= Gonophora integra =

Scientific classification
- Kingdom: Animalia
- Phylum: Arthropoda
- Clade: Pancrustacea
- Class: Insecta
- Order: Coleoptera
- Suborder: Polyphaga
- Infraorder: Cucujiformia
- Family: Chrysomelidae
- Genus: Gonophora
- Species: G. integra

Binomial name
- Gonophora integra Baly, 1858

Synonyms
- Gonophora integra insulana Gestro, 1896

Species of beetle

Gonophora integra is a species of beetle of the family Chrysomelidae. It is found in Indonesia (Sumatra and possibly Java).

== Description ==
Adults are elongate, subdepressed and bright shining testaceous. The antennae (their basal joint excepted) and the elytra are black. The head is smooth. The thorax is broader at the base than long, the sides narrowly margined, parallel and subsinuate behind, rounded and slightly produced in the middle, narrowed and deeply sinuate in front, their outer border minutely serrate. The anterior margin is straight, above convex, longitudinally grooved down the middle and just within the outer border. The extreme base in the middle is deflexed and impressed with a transverse groove, on the hinder portion of the disc is a deep transverse excavation, which curves upwards and outwards on either side, and is produced as far as the middle of the lateral border. The surface is smooth and shining, coarsely punctured. The scutellum is smooth, its apex piceous. The elytra are broader than the base of the thorax, their shoulders rounded, the sides parallel, their outer border entire, the apex obtusely rounded, finely serrulate, above subdepressed along the suture, convex on the sides. Each elytron has three elevated costae, the upper margins of which are not undulate, the margin of the outer costa serrate, the interspaces deeply impressed with a double row of deep punctures, the second interspace from the suture irregularly punctured at its base, the interstices transversely costulate and irregularly anastomosing, black, the extreme base obscure testaceous.

== Life history ==
The recorded host plants for this species are Amomum, Nicolaia and Zingiber species.
