= Gonophora bowringii =

Scientific classification
- Kingdom: Animalia
- Phylum: Arthropoda
- Clade: Pancrustacea
- Class: Insecta
- Order: Coleoptera
- Suborder: Polyphaga
- Infraorder: Cucujiformia
- Family: Chrysomelidae
- Genus: Gonophora
- Species: G. bowringii

Binomial name
- Gonophora bowringii Baly, 1858

Species of beetle

Gonophora bowringii is a species of beetle of the family Chrysomelidae. It is found in Indonesia (Java).

== Description ==
Adults are very similar to Gonophora xanthomela, with which it exactly agrees in the form and sculpturing of its thorax. It differs from that species in the colouration of the thorax, and in the coarser and more irregular punctation of the outer disc of the elytra. The head is smooth, the vertex behind and the base of the antennae piceous. The thorax is similar in shape and puncturing to Gonophora xanthomela, but the lateral margin is rather more coarsely serrate and the lateral border and five spots on the disc, four nearly parallel, are placed transversely across the middle, the two outer confluent with the lateral border, and a fifth in the middle behind, pitchy black. The scutellum is black and impunctate. The elytra are also similar in shape to Gonophora xanthomela, but the two outer longitudinal costae are much less distinct, the intermediate one nearly obsolete in the middle, leaving visible only a row of stout acute teeth, the interspaces towards the sides and on the outer disc are more irregularly punctate, puncturing over the whole surface very deeply impressed, interstices strongly elevated, black, an apical spot, and some irregular patches at the base and on the disc, testaceo-fulvous.

== Life history ==
The recorded host plants for this species are Curcuma species and Zingiber cassumunar.
