= Gonophora xanthomela =

Scientific classification
- Kingdom: Animalia
- Phylum: Arthropoda
- Clade: Pancrustacea
- Class: Insecta
- Order: Coleoptera
- Suborder: Polyphaga
- Infraorder: Cucujiformia
- Family: Chrysomelidae
- Genus: Gonophora
- Species: G. xanthomela

Binomial name
- Gonophora xanthomela (Wiedemann, 1823)

Synonyms
- Hispa xanthomela Wiedemann, 1823; Gonophora orientalis Guérin-Méneville, 1844

Species of beetle

Gonophora xanthomela is a species of beetle of the family Chrysomelidae. It is found in Indonesia (Borneo, Java, Sumatra) and Malaysia.

== Description ==
The shape and sculpture of the adults is similar to Gonophora haemorrhoidalis, but the antennae are rather more robust, their apical half, and sometimes their whole length, rufo-fulvous. Also, the sides of the thorax are less produced, nearly straight from their base to beyond the middle and the central groove on the upper surface is more distinct. The elytra are black, with an apical spot and several others at the base and on the disc rufo-fulvous. Furthermore, the outer edge is less coarsely serrate and the inner carina is less undulate.

== Life history ==
The recorded host plants for this species are Musa, Orchidaceae, Amomum, Nicolaia, Zingiber and Elettaria species.
