= Downesia sulcata =

Scientific classification
- Kingdom: Animalia
- Phylum: Arthropoda
- Class: Insecta
- Order: Coleoptera
- Suborder: Polyphaga
- Infraorder: Cucujiformia
- Family: Chrysomelidae
- Genus: Downesia
- Species: D. sulcata

Binomial name
- Downesia sulcata Fleutiaux, 1877

Synonyms
- Downesia tonkinea Pic, 1924; Downesia subnotata Pic, 1938

Species of beetle

Downesia sulcata is a species of beetle of the family Chrysomelidae. It is found in Thailand and Vietnam.

== Description ==
Adults reach a length of about 5.5 mm. This species is similar to Downesia tarsata. The adults are reddish-yellow. There are three raised ribs on each elytron, separated from each other by two rows of deeply depressed dots. Furthermore, the posterior third of the elytra is black.

== Life history ==
No host plant has been documented for this species.

== Taxonomy ==
Some sources list the author as Raffaello Gestro, but this is in error.
