= Gonophora nigricauda =

Scientific classification
- Kingdom: Animalia
- Phylum: Arthropoda
- Clade: Pancrustacea
- Class: Insecta
- Order: Coleoptera
- Suborder: Polyphaga
- Infraorder: Cucujiformia
- Family: Chrysomelidae
- Genus: Gonophora
- Species: G. nigricauda

Binomial name
- Gonophora nigricauda (Motschulsky, 1866)

Synonyms
- Anisodera nigricauda Motschulsky, 1866; Micrispa nigricauda (Motschulsky). Weise, 1904; Gonophora nigricauda (Motschulsky). Maulik, 1919; Gonophora taprobanae Gestro, 1902

Species of beetle

Gonophora nigricauda, is a species of leaf beetle in the tribe Gonophorini and found in Sri Lanka.
