= Downesia vandykei =

Scientific classification
- Kingdom: Animalia
- Phylum: Arthropoda
- Class: Insecta
- Order: Coleoptera
- Suborder: Polyphaga
- Infraorder: Cucujiformia
- Family: Chrysomelidae
- Genus: Downesia
- Species: D. vandykei

Binomial name
- Downesia vandykei Gressitt, 1939

Species of beetle

Downesia vandykei is a species of beetle of the family Chrysomelidae. It is found in China (Zhejiang, Fujian) and Vietnam.

== Life history ==
The recorded host plants for this species are Bambusa species.
