= Downesia gestroi =

Scientific classification
- Kingdom: Animalia
- Phylum: Arthropoda
- Class: Insecta
- Order: Coleoptera
- Suborder: Polyphaga
- Infraorder: Cucujiformia
- Family: Chrysomelidae
- Genus: Downesia
- Species: D. gestroi

Binomial name
- Downesia gestroi Baly, 1888

Synonyms
- Downesia ruficolor Pic, 1924; Downesia donckieri Pic, 1924; Downesia atripes Pic, 1928

Species of beetle

Downesia gestroi is a species of beetle of the family Chrysomelidae. It is found in Bangladesh, Bhutan, China (Yunnan), India (Sikkim, West Bengal), Laos, Myanmar, Nepal, Thailand and Vietnam.

== Life history ==
The recorded host plants for this species are Neyraudia species and Phragmites communis.
