= Agoniella banksi =

Scientific classification
- Kingdom: Animalia
- Phylum: Arthropoda
- Class: Insecta
- Order: Coleoptera
- Suborder: Polyphaga
- Infraorder: Cucujiformia
- Family: Chrysomelidae
- Genus: Agoniella
- Species: A. banksi

Binomial name
- Agoniella banksi (Weise, 1910)

Synonyms
- Agonia banksi Weise, 1910

Species of beetle

Agoniella banksi is a species of beetle of the family Chrysomelidae. It is found in the Philippines (Luzon, Mindanao, Palawan).

== Life history ==
No host plant has been documented for this species.
