= Gonophora pallida =

Scientific classification
- Kingdom: Animalia
- Phylum: Arthropoda
- Clade: Pancrustacea
- Class: Insecta
- Order: Coleoptera
- Suborder: Polyphaga
- Infraorder: Cucujiformia
- Family: Chrysomelidae
- Genus: Gonophora
- Species: G. pallida

Binomial name
- Gonophora pallida Baly, 1858

Species of beetle

Gonophora pallida is a species of beetle of the family Chrysomelidae. It is found in Indonesia (Sumatra) and Malaysia.

== Description ==
Adults are elongate, subdepressed along the back and pale shining fulvous. The antennae (their base excepted) are black. The thorax is broader than long, the sides narrowly margined, subparallel and indistinctly sinuate behind, slightly produced and rounded near their middle, narrowed and sinuate in front, the margin finely serrate, above cylindrical at the extreme apex, which is separated from the rest of the surface by a distinct groove. The disc is gibbous, coarsely rugose-punctate, the central line with a longitudinal groove. On either side is a large deep excavation which runs obliquely outwards from the centre of the hinder disc to the outer border near its middle extreme base with its central portion deflexed, transversely grooved. The scutellum is smooth and impunctate. The elytra are broader than the thorax, the sides parallel, rather broader behind, the apex rounded, its margin finely serrate, above flattened along the suture, convex on the sides. Each elytron has three elevated costae, their upper edge near the apex, and the whole length of the outer one coarsely serrate, the interspaces each impressed with a double row of large deep punctures, the second interspace from the suture with a third row at its base.

== Life history ==
No host plant has been documented for this species.
