= Agoniella strandi =

Scientific classification
- Kingdom: Animalia
- Phylum: Arthropoda
- Class: Insecta
- Order: Coleoptera
- Suborder: Polyphaga
- Infraorder: Cucujiformia
- Family: Chrysomelidae
- Genus: Agoniella
- Species: A. strandi

Binomial name
- Agoniella strandi Uhmann, 1955

Species of beetle

Agoniella strandi is a species of beetle of the family Chrysomelidae. It is found in the Philippines (Luzon, Palawan, Tawi).

== Life history ==
No host plant has been documented for this species.
