= Downesia auberti =

Scientific classification
- Kingdom: Animalia
- Phylum: Arthropoda
- Class: Insecta
- Order: Coleoptera
- Suborder: Polyphaga
- Infraorder: Cucujiformia
- Family: Chrysomelidae
- Genus: Downesia
- Species: D. auberti

Binomial name
- Downesia auberti (Fairmaire, 1888)

Synonyms
- Hanoia auberti Fairmaire, 1888; Downesia latenigra Pic, 1924; Downesia latenigra basipennis Pic, 1924; Downesia nigra Pic, 1934; Downesia diversepunctata Pic, 1935

Species of beetle

Downesia auberti is a species of beetle of the family Chrysomelidae. It is found in China (Fujian) and Vietnam.

== Life history ==
No host plant has been documented for this species.
