= Downesia negrosica =

Scientific classification
- Kingdom: Animalia
- Phylum: Arthropoda
- Class: Insecta
- Order: Coleoptera
- Suborder: Polyphaga
- Infraorder: Cucujiformia
- Family: Chrysomelidae
- Genus: Downesia
- Species: D. negrosica

Binomial name
- Downesia negrosica Uhmann, 1948

Synonyms
- Downesia sumatrana Uhmann, 1933 (not Gestro, 1897)

Species of beetle

Downesia negrosica is a species of beetle of the family Chrysomelidae. It is found in the Philippines (Negros).

== Life history ==
No host plant has been documented for this species.
