= Gonophora rufula =

Scientific classification
- Kingdom: Animalia
- Phylum: Arthropoda
- Clade: Pancrustacea
- Class: Insecta
- Order: Coleoptera
- Suborder: Polyphaga
- Infraorder: Cucujiformia
- Family: Chrysomelidae
- Genus: Gonophora
- Species: G. rufula

Binomial name
- Gonophora rufula Gestro, 1897

Synonyms
- Gonophora fulva Gestro, 1897; Distolaca sanguinolenta Chapuis, 1875

Species of beetle

Gonophora rufula is a species of beetle of the family Chrysomelidae. It is found in Indonesia (Sumatra), Malaysia (Malacca), and the Philippines (Palawan).

== Life history ==
No host plant has been documented for this species.
