= Gonophora chalybeata =

Scientific classification
- Kingdom: Animalia
- Phylum: Arthropoda
- Clade: Pancrustacea
- Class: Insecta
- Order: Coleoptera
- Suborder: Polyphaga
- Infraorder: Cucujiformia
- Family: Chrysomelidae
- Genus: Gonophora
- Species: G. chalybeata

Binomial name
- Gonophora chalybeata Baly, 1858

Synonyms
- Gonophora funebris Weise, 1905

Species of beetle

Gonophora chalybeata is a species of beetle of the family Chrysomelidae. It is found in Sarawak, Kalimantan and Singapore.

== Description ==
Adults are elongate, subdepressed and shining black, with a faint metallic blue reflexion. The elytra are dark metallic blue. The head is smooth, impressed on the vertex with a distinct fovea. The antennae are slender, the four apical joints white, closely covered-with adpressed whitish hairs. The thorax is one-third longer than broad, the sides margined, nearly parallel and slightly subsinuate from their base to just beyond their middle, narrowed and deeply sinuate in front, the margin produced, and obtusely angled just beyond its middle, obsoletely serrate, above subcylindrical at the anterior margin, the disc gibbous, coarsely and variolose punctate, smooth, and longitudinally grooved down its middle, the hinder portion near the base deeply impressed with a broad transverse excavation, which extends obliquely upwards on either side to the lateral border, the basal margin transversely grooved. The scutellum is smooth and black. The elytra are broader than the base of the thorax, the sides straight and parallel, their outer border entire, the apex rounded, the apical margin finely serrate, above subdepressed along the suture, convex on the sides. Each elytron has three strongly elevated costae, the outer one less raised, nearly obsolete in the middle, its upper margin coarsely serrate, the interspaces impressed with a double row of large deep punctures, the second interspace from the suture with a third row at its base, the interstices transversely costulate. The upper margin of the longitudinal costae is black, the rest of the surface is dark metallic blue.

== Life history ==
No host plant has been documented for this species.
