= Gonophora apicalis =

Scientific classification
- Kingdom: Animalia
- Phylum: Arthropoda
- Clade: Pancrustacea
- Class: Insecta
- Order: Coleoptera
- Suborder: Polyphaga
- Infraorder: Cucujiformia
- Family: Chrysomelidae
- Genus: Gonophora
- Species: G. apicalis

Binomial name
- Gonophora apicalis Baly, 1858

Species of beetle

Gonophora apicalis is a species of beetle of the family Chrysomelidae. It is found in Indonesia (Sulawesi) and the Philippines (Catanduanes, Luzon, Mindanao, Polillo).

== Description ==
Adults are elongate, subdepressed and pale shining fulvous. The antennae and the posterior third of the elytra are black. The head is smooth and indistinctly rugose on the vertex, while the antennae are black (with the basal joint obscure piceous. The thorax is one-third broader than long, substrangulate at the apex, the sides margined, straight and parallel, obtusely angled just before the middle, recurved and deeply sinuate in front, their outer edge finely serrate, above convex, cylindrical at the extreme apex, the disc gibbous, its posterior portion with a deep transverse rugose excavation which runs obliquely upwards on either side to beyond the middle of the lateral border. The disc is smooth and shining, impressed on either side with a few large deep punctures, the basal margin grooved. The scutellum is smooth and impunctate. The elytra are broader than the thorax, the sides parallel, narrowly margined, their outer border finely serrate and the apex rounded, above flattened along the back, convex on the sides. Each elytron has three elevated costae, the outer one less raised in the middle, its upper margin serrate, the interspaces with a double row of deep punctures, their interstices transversely costulate, pale shining fulvous, the apical third black.

== Life history ==
No host plant has been documented for this species.
