= Downesia kwangtunga =

Scientific classification
- Kingdom: Animalia
- Phylum: Arthropoda
- Class: Insecta
- Order: Coleoptera
- Suborder: Polyphaga
- Infraorder: Cucujiformia
- Family: Chrysomelidae
- Genus: Downesia
- Species: D. kwangtunga

Binomial name
- Downesia kwangtunga Gressitt, 1950

Species of beetle

Downesia kwangtunga is a species of beetle of the family Chrysomelidae. It is found in China (Guangdong).

== Description ==
Adults reach a length of about 3.5–5.5 mm. They have a shortened row of several punctures on the apical one-fifth of the elytra.

== Life history ==
No host plant has been documented for this species.
