= Gonophora =

Scientific classification
- Kingdom: Animalia
- Phylum: Arthropoda
- Class: Insecta
- Order: Coleoptera
- Suborder: Polyphaga
- Infraorder: Cucujiformia
- Family: Chrysomelidae
- Subfamily: Cassidinae
- Tribe: Gonophorini
- Genus: Gonophora; Chevrolat, 1837

Synonyms
- Gonophora Guérin-Méneville, 1844; Distolaca Baly 1858

Genus of leaf beetles

Gonophora is a type genus of tribe Gonophorini, consisting of Asian leaf beetles in the subfamily Cassidinae; it was erected by Louis Chevrolat in 1836.

== Species ==
Biolib includes:

1. Gonophora aemula Gestro, 1897
2. Gonophora albitarsis Gestro, 1909
3. Gonophora angulipennis Gestro, 1913
4. Gonophora angusta Gestro, 1917
5. Gonophora apicalis Baly, 1858
6. Gonophora atra Gestro, 1885
7. Gonophora basalis Gestro, 1885
8. Gonophora bicoloripes Pic, 1930
9. Gonophora bimaculata (Chapuis, 1876)
10. Gonophora blandula Würmli, 1976
11. Gonophora borneana Gressitt, 1939
12. Gonophora bowringii Baly, 1858
13. Gonophora brevicornis Weise, 1905
14. Gonophora cariosa Gestro, 1897
15. Gonophora cariosicollis Gestro, 1902
16. Gonophora chalybeata Baly, 1858
17. Gonophora chapuisi Baly, 1876
18. Gonophora clathrata Gestro, 1906
19. Gonophora coomani Pic, 1930
20. Gonophora diluta Gestro, 1897
21. Gonophora donckieri Pic, 1930
22. Gonophora exilis Gestro, 1919
23. Gonophora femorata Weise, 1913
24. Gonophora gibbera Uhmann, 1960
25. Gonophora hartmanni Medvedev, 2012
26. Gonophora haemorrhoidalis (Weber, 1801)
27. Gonophora integra Baly, 1858
28. Gonophora laevicollis Uhmann, 1928
29. Gonophora lineata Baly, 1878
30. Gonophora linkei Uhmann, 1930
31. Gonophora maculipennis Gestro, 1906
32. Gonophora masoni Baly, 1888
33. Gonophora mindoroica Uhmann, 1955
34. Gonophora mjobergi Uhmann, 1939
35. Gonophora nigricauda (Motschulsky, 1866)
36. Gonophora nigrimembris Weise, 1924
37. Gonophora nitidicollis Gestro, 1899
38. Gonophora oenoptera Gestro, 1897
39. Gonophora opacipennis Gestro, 1902
40. Gonophora pallida Baly, 1858
41. Gonophora pitambara Basu, 1999
42. Gonophora pulchella Gestro, 1888
43. Gonophora raapii (Gestro, 1897)
44. Gonophora raktava Basu, 1999
45. Gonophora ritsemae Gestro, 1896
46. Gonophora rufula Gestro, 1897
47. Gonophora sundaica Gestro, 1909
48. Gonophora taylori Spaeth, 1933
49. Gonophora tibialis Baly, 1878
50. Gonophora uhmanni Pic, 1930
51. Gonophora unifasciata Gestro, 1885
52. Gonophora unimaculata Pic, 1930
53. Gonophora whitei (Baly, 1858)
54. Gonophora xanthomela (Wiedemann, 1823)
