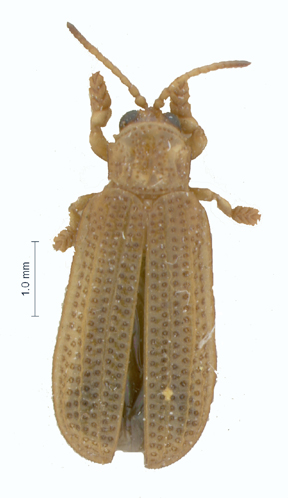

Scientific classification
- Kingdom: Animalia
- Phylum: Arthropoda
- Class: Insecta
- Order: Coleoptera
- Suborder: Polyphaga
- Infraorder: Cucujiformia
- Family: Chrysomelidae
- Genus: Wallacispa
- Species: W. tibialis

Binomial name
- Wallacispa tibialis Uhmann, 1940

= Wallacispa tibialis =

Species of beetle

Wallacispa tibialis is a species of beetle of the family Chrysomelidae. It is found in the Philippines (Mindanao).

== Life history ==
No host plant has been documented for this species.
