= Gonophora hartmanni =

Scientific classification
- Kingdom: Animalia
- Phylum: Arthropoda
- Clade: Pancrustacea
- Class: Insecta
- Order: Coleoptera
- Suborder: Polyphaga
- Infraorder: Cucujiformia
- Family: Chrysomelidae
- Genus: Gonophora
- Species: G. hartmanni

Binomial name
- Gonophora hartmanni Medvedev, 2012

Species of beetle

Gonophora hartmanni is a species of beetle of the family Chrysomelidae. It is found in Thailand.

== Description ==
Adults reach a length of about 5.7 mm. They are fulvous, with the third segment of the antennae darkened and with a small darkened area on the base of the prothorax. The scutellum and elytra are black, the latter with a few fulvous areas.

== Etymology ==
The species is named for Matthias Hartmann, a friend of the author.
