= Gonophora whitei =

Scientific classification
- Kingdom: Animalia
- Phylum: Arthropoda
- Clade: Pancrustacea
- Class: Insecta
- Order: Coleoptera
- Suborder: Polyphaga
- Infraorder: Cucujiformia
- Family: Chrysomelidae
- Genus: Gonophora
- Species: G. whitei

Binomial name
- Gonophora whitei (Baly, 1858)

Synonyms
- Distolaca whitei Baly, 1858

Species of beetle

Gonophora whitei is a species of beetle of the family Chrysomelidae. It is found in Indonesia (Borneo) and Malaysia.

== Description ==
Adults are elongate, subdepressed along the back and shining testaceous above. The antennae are black and the elytra are deep metallic blue, their extreme base testaceous. The head is smooth and the antennae have their basal joint, and also the extreme apex of the second, stained with rufous. The thorax is transverse-quadrate, the sides margined, sinuate behind, slightly produced and rounded in front, notched at their extreme apex, the outer edge of the margin obsoletely crenate, above very convex, cylindrical at the apex, surface smooth and shining, irregularly excavated and impressed with a few deep punctures. The anterior margin and a broad longitudinal space in the middle are longitudinally grooved along its centre, and an elevated ridge is found on either side, free from punctures, bright shining testaceous, the extreme lateral margin is piceous. The scutellum is smooth and impunctate. The elytra are broader than the base of the thorax, the sides margined, subparallel, slightly dilated along their middle, the apex rounded, above flattened along the suture, convex on the sides. Each elytron has three elevated costae, the outer one less raised in the middle, the interspaces deeply impressed with a double row of punctures, the interstices transversely costate, the second interspace from the suture with a third row of punctures at its base, shining chalybeate, their extreme base testaceous.

== Life history ==
No host plant has been documented for this species.
