= Gonophora lineata =

Scientific classification
- Kingdom: Animalia
- Phylum: Arthropoda
- Clade: Pancrustacea
- Class: Insecta
- Order: Coleoptera
- Suborder: Polyphaga
- Infraorder: Cucujiformia
- Family: Chrysomelidae
- Genus: Gonophora
- Species: G. lineata

Binomial name
- Gonophora lineata Baly, 1878

Species of beetle

Gonophora lineata is a species of beetle of the family Chrysomelidae. It is found in the Philippines (Sulu).

== Life history ==
No host plant has been documented for this species.
