= Downesia ratana =

Scientific classification
- Kingdom: Animalia
- Phylum: Arthropoda
- Class: Insecta
- Order: Coleoptera
- Suborder: Polyphaga
- Infraorder: Cucujiformia
- Family: Chrysomelidae
- Genus: Downesia
- Species: D. ratana

Binomial name
- Downesia ratana Maulik, 1919

Species of beetle

Downesia ratana is a species of beetle of the family Chrysomelidae. It is found in Malaysia and Myanmar.

== Life history ==
No host plant has been documented for this species.
