= Gonophora femorata =

Scientific classification
- Kingdom: Animalia
- Phylum: Arthropoda
- Clade: Pancrustacea
- Class: Insecta
- Order: Coleoptera
- Suborder: Polyphaga
- Infraorder: Cucujiformia
- Family: Chrysomelidae
- Genus: Gonophora
- Species: G. femorata

Binomial name
- Gonophora femorata Weise, 1913

Synonyms
- Gonophora bakeri Uhmann, 1930

Species of beetle

Gonophora femorata is a species of beetle of the family Chrysomelidae. It is found in the Philippines (Leyte, Luzon, Masbate, Mindanao, Negros, Palawan, Samar).

== Life history ==
No host plant has been documented for this species.
