= Gonophora angusta =

Scientific classification
- Kingdom: Animalia
- Phylum: Arthropoda
- Clade: Pancrustacea
- Class: Insecta
- Order: Coleoptera
- Suborder: Polyphaga
- Infraorder: Cucujiformia
- Family: Chrysomelidae
- Genus: Gonophora
- Species: G. angusta

Binomial name
- Gonophora angusta Gestro, 1917

Species of beetle

Gonophora angusta is a species of beetle of the family Chrysomelidae. It is found in the Philippines (Luzon, Mindanao).

== Life history ==
No host plant has been documented for this species.
