= Wallacispa javana =

Scientific classification
- Kingdom: Animalia
- Phylum: Arthropoda
- Clade: Pancrustacea
- Class: Insecta
- Order: Coleoptera
- Suborder: Polyphaga
- Infraorder: Cucujiformia
- Family: Chrysomelidae
- Genus: Wallacispa
- Species: W. javana

Binomial name
- Wallacispa javana Uhmann, 1955

Species of beetle

Wallacispa javana is a species of beetle of the family Chrysomelidae. It is found in Indonesia (Sulawesi).

== Life history ==
The recorded host plants for this species are Metroxylon species.
