= Gonophora masoni =

Scientific classification
- Kingdom: Animalia
- Phylum: Arthropoda
- Clade: Pancrustacea
- Class: Insecta
- Order: Coleoptera
- Suborder: Polyphaga
- Infraorder: Cucujiformia
- Family: Chrysomelidae
- Genus: Gonophora
- Species: G. masoni

Binomial name
- Gonophora masoni Baly, 1888

Species of beetle

Gonophora masoni is a species of beetle of the family Chrysomelidae. It is found in India (Andaman Islands).

== Life history ==
The recorded host plants for this species are Curcuma species.
