= Downesia nigripennis =

Scientific classification
- Kingdom: Animalia
- Phylum: Arthropoda
- Class: Insecta
- Order: Coleoptera
- Suborder: Polyphaga
- Infraorder: Cucujiformia
- Family: Chrysomelidae
- Genus: Downesia
- Species: D. nigripennis

Binomial name
- Downesia nigripennis Chen and Tan, 1962

Species of beetle

Downesia nigripennis is a species of beetle of the family Chrysomelidae. It is found in China (Yunnan).

== Life history ==
No host plant has been documented for this species.
