= Klitispa opacula =

Scientific classification
- Kingdom: Animalia
- Phylum: Arthropoda
- Clade: Pancrustacea
- Class: Insecta
- Order: Coleoptera
- Suborder: Polyphaga
- Infraorder: Cucujiformia
- Family: Chrysomelidae
- Genus: Klitispa
- Species: K. opacula

Binomial name
- Klitispa opacula (Spaeth, 1933)

Synonyms
- Agonia opacula Spaeth, 1933

Species of beetle

Klitispa opacula is a species of beetle of the family Chrysomelidae. It is found in Indonesia (Java, Sumatra).

== Life history ==
The recorded host plants for this species are bamboo species (Poaceae).
