= Klitispa =

Scientific classification
- Kingdom: Animalia
- Phylum: Arthropoda
- Class: Insecta
- Order: Coleoptera
- Suborder: Polyphaga
- Infraorder: Cucujiformia
- Family: Chrysomelidae
- Subfamily: Cassidinae
- Tribe: Gonophorini
- Genus: Klitispa; Uhmann, 1940

Genus of leaf beetles

Klitispa is a genus of beetles belonging to the family Chrysomelidae.

== Species ==
- Klitispa corrugata (Spaeth, 1933)
- Klitispa mutilata Chen & Sun, 1964
- Klitispa nigripennis (Weise, 1905)
- Klitispa opacicollis (Gestro, 1917)
- Klitispa opacula (Spaeth, 1933)
- Klitispa rugicollis (Gestro, 1890)
