= Gonophora cariosa =

Scientific classification
- Kingdom: Animalia
- Phylum: Arthropoda
- Clade: Pancrustacea
- Class: Insecta
- Order: Coleoptera
- Suborder: Polyphaga
- Infraorder: Cucujiformia
- Family: Chrysomelidae
- Genus: Gonophora
- Species: G. cariosa

Binomial name
- Gonophora cariosa Gestro, 1897

Synonyms
- Gonophora orientalis Gestro, 1885 (not Guérin-Méneville, 1844)

Species of beetle

Gonophora cariosa is a species of beetle of the family Chrysomelidae. It is found in Sarawak, Singapore and Sumatra.

== Life history ==
No host plant has been documented for this species.
