= Agoniella manilensis =

Scientific classification
- Kingdom: Animalia
- Phylum: Arthropoda
- Class: Insecta
- Order: Coleoptera
- Suborder: Polyphaga
- Infraorder: Cucujiformia
- Family: Chrysomelidae
- Genus: Agoniella
- Species: A. manilensis

Binomial name
- Agoniella manilensis (Weise, 1910)

Synonyms
- Agonia manilensis Weise, 1910

Species of beetle

Agoniella manilensis is a species of beetle of the family Chrysomelidae. It is found in the Philippines (Catanduanes, Luzon, Masbate, Panaon, Samar).

== Life history ==
The recorded host plants for this species are Bamboo species.
