= Klitispa opacicollis =

Scientific classification
- Kingdom: Animalia
- Phylum: Arthropoda
- Class: Insecta
- Order: Coleoptera
- Suborder: Polyphaga
- Infraorder: Cucujiformia
- Family: Chrysomelidae
- Genus: Klitispa
- Species: K. opacicollis

Binomial name
- Klitispa opacicollis (Gestro, 1917)

Synonyms
- Agonia opacicollis Gestro, 1917

Species of beetle

Klitispa opacicollis is a species of beetle of the family Chrysomelidae. It is found in the Philippines (Biliran, Cebu, Luzon, Mindanao, Negros, Panaon, Panay, and Samar).

== Life history ==
No host plant has been documented for this species.
