= Agoniella podagrica =

Scientific classification
- Kingdom: Animalia
- Phylum: Arthropoda
- Class: Insecta
- Order: Coleoptera
- Suborder: Polyphaga
- Infraorder: Cucujiformia
- Family: Chrysomelidae
- Genus: Agoniella
- Species: A. podagrica

Binomial name
- Agoniella podagrica (Gestro, 1896)

Synonyms
- Distolaca podagrica Gestro, 1896

Species of beetle

Agoniella podagrica is a species of beetle of the family Chrysomelidae. It is found in Indonesia (Sumatra).

== Life history ==
No host plant has been documented for this species.
