= Downesia sumatrana =

Scientific classification
- Kingdom: Animalia
- Phylum: Arthropoda
- Clade: Pancrustacea
- Class: Insecta
- Order: Coleoptera
- Suborder: Polyphaga
- Infraorder: Cucujiformia
- Family: Chrysomelidae
- Genus: Downesia
- Species: D. sumatrana

Binomial name
- Downesia sumatrana Gestro, 1897

Synonyms
- Downesia sumatrana reducta Pic, 1924

Species of beetle

Downesia sumatrana is a species of beetle of the family Chrysomelidae. It is found in Indonesia (Borneo, Sumatra) and Malaysia.

== Life history ==
The host plants for this species are Bambusa species.
