= Gonophora uhmanni =

Scientific classification
- Kingdom: Animalia
- Phylum: Arthropoda
- Clade: Pancrustacea
- Class: Insecta
- Order: Coleoptera
- Suborder: Polyphaga
- Infraorder: Cucujiformia
- Family: Chrysomelidae
- Genus: Gonophora
- Species: G. uhmanni

Binomial name
- Gonophora uhmanni Pic, 1930

Synonyms
- Gonophora uhmanni reducta Pic, 1930

Species of beetle

Gonophora uhmanni is a species of beetle of the family Chrysomelidae. It is found in Indonesia (Mentawai Islands).

== Life history ==
No host plant has been documented for this species.
