= Agoniella tersa =

Scientific classification
- Kingdom: Animalia
- Phylum: Arthropoda
- Class: Insecta
- Order: Coleoptera
- Suborder: Polyphaga
- Infraorder: Cucujiformia
- Family: Chrysomelidae
- Genus: Agoniella
- Species: A. tersa

Binomial name
- Agoniella tersa (Gestro, 1897)

Synonyms
- Distolaca tersa Gestro, 1897

Species of beetle

Agoniella tersa is a species of beetle of the family Chrysomelidae. It is found in Indonesia (Borneo) and Malaysia.

== Life history ==
No host plant has been documented for this species.
