= Downesia strigicollis =

Scientific classification
- Kingdom: Animalia
- Phylum: Arthropoda
- Clade: Pancrustacea
- Class: Insecta
- Order: Coleoptera
- Suborder: Polyphaga
- Infraorder: Cucujiformia
- Family: Chrysomelidae
- Genus: Downesia
- Species: D. strigicollis

Binomial name
- Downesia strigicollis Baly, 1876

Synonyms
- Downesia angustata Fleutiaux, 1887

Species of beetle

Downesia strigicollis is a species of beetle of the family Chrysomelidae. It is found in China (Yunnan), India (Annam), Myanmar, Thailand and Vietnam.

== Life history ==
The recorded host plants for this species are Bambusa species.
