= Agoniella horsfieldi =

Scientific classification
- Kingdom: Animalia
- Phylum: Arthropoda
- Clade: Pancrustacea
- Class: Insecta
- Order: Coleoptera
- Suborder: Polyphaga
- Infraorder: Cucujiformia
- Family: Chrysomelidae
- Genus: Agoniella
- Species: A. horsfieldi

Binomial name
- Agoniella horsfieldi (Baly, 1878)

Synonyms
- Gonophora horsfieldi Baly, 1878

Species of beetle

Agoniella horsfieldi is a species of beetle of the family Chrysomelidae. It is found in Indonesia (Java) and New Guinea.

== Life history ==
No host plant has been documented for this species.
