= Downesia javana =

Scientific classification
- Kingdom: Animalia
- Phylum: Arthropoda
- Clade: Pancrustacea
- Class: Insecta
- Order: Coleoptera
- Suborder: Polyphaga
- Infraorder: Cucujiformia
- Family: Chrysomelidae
- Genus: Downesia
- Species: D. javana

Binomial name
- Downesia javana Weise, 1928

Synonyms
- Downesia javana nigerrima Uhmann, 1935; Downesia javana ginpinica Chen & Tan, 1962; Downesia nitida Uhmann, 1928

Species of beetle

Downesia javana is a species of beetle of the family Chrysomelidae. It is found in China (Yunnan) and Indonesia (Java).

== Life history ==
The recorded host plants for this species are bamboo species (Poaceae).
