= Downesia abdominalis =

Scientific classification
- Kingdom: Animalia
- Phylum: Arthropoda
- Class: Insecta
- Order: Coleoptera
- Suborder: Polyphaga
- Infraorder: Cucujiformia
- Family: Chrysomelidae
- Genus: Downesia
- Species: D. abdominalis

Binomial name
- Downesia abdominalis Weise, 1922

Species of beetle

Downesia abdominalis is a species of beetle of the family Chrysomelidae. It is found in India (Sikkim).

== Description ==
Adults reach a length of about 6 mm. They are deep black and glossy, with a reddish-yellow abdomen. The antennae are longer than in most other Downesia species. The elytra are rather finely dotted in the double rows, the first two joined before the middle.

== Life history ==
No host plant has been documented for this species.
