= Downesia perniciosa =

Scientific classification
- Kingdom: Animalia
- Phylum: Arthropoda
- Clade: Pancrustacea
- Class: Insecta
- Order: Coleoptera
- Suborder: Polyphaga
- Infraorder: Cucujiformia
- Family: Chrysomelidae
- Genus: Downesia
- Species: D. perniciosa

Binomial name
- Downesia perniciosa Spaeth, 1933

Species of beetle

Downesia perniciosa is a species of beetle of the family Chrysomelidae. It is found in Indonesia (Java).

== Life history ==
The recorded host plants for this species are Bambusa species.
