= Gonophora ritsemae =

Scientific classification
- Kingdom: Animalia
- Phylum: Arthropoda
- Clade: Pancrustacea
- Class: Insecta
- Order: Coleoptera
- Suborder: Polyphaga
- Infraorder: Cucujiformia
- Family: Chrysomelidae
- Genus: Gonophora
- Species: G. ritsemae

Binomial name
- Gonophora ritsemae Gestro, 1896

Species of beetle

Gonophora ritsemae is a species of beetle of the family Chrysomelidae. It is found on Natuna.

== Life history ==
No host plant has been documented for this species.
