= Klitispa nigripennis =

Scientific classification
- Kingdom: Animalia
- Phylum: Arthropoda
- Class: Insecta
- Order: Coleoptera
- Suborder: Polyphaga
- Infraorder: Cucujiformia
- Family: Chrysomelidae
- Genus: Klitispa
- Species: K. nigripennis

Binomial name
- Klitispa nigripennis (Weise, 1905)

Synonyms
- Agonia nigripennis Weise, 1905

Species of beetle

Klitispa nigripennis is a species of beetle of the family Chrysomelidae. It is found in China and Indonesia (Sumatra).

== Life history ==
No host plant has been documented for this species.
