= Agoniella =

Scientific classification
- Kingdom: Animalia
- Phylum: Arthropoda
- Class: Insecta
- Order: Coleoptera
- Suborder: Polyphaga
- Infraorder: Cucujiformia
- Family: Chrysomelidae
- Subfamily: Cassidinae
- Tribe: Gonophorini
- Genus: Agoniella; Weise, 1911

Genus of leaf beetles

Agoniella is a genus of beetles belonging to the family Chrysomelidae.

== Species ==
- Agoniella apicalis (Baly, 1858)
- Agoniella banksi (Weise, 1910)
- Agoniella biformis (Uhmann, 1932)
- Agoniella crassipes (Baly, 1878)
- Agoniella dimidiata (Gestro, 1897)
- Agoniella horsfieldi (Baly, 1878)
- Agoniella longula (Gestro, 1917)
- Agoniella manilensis (Weise, 1910)
- Agoniella moluccana (Gestro, 1897)
- Agoniella munda (Gestro, 1897)
- Agoniella podagrica (Gestro, 1896)
- Agoniella pygmaea (Gestro, 1917)
- Agoniella rotundicollis (Gestro, 1917)
- Agoniella rufonigra (Gestro, 1919)
- Agoniella schultzei (Uhmann, 1932)
- Agoniella sonani (Chûjô, 1933)
- Agoniella strandi Uhmann, 1955
- Agoniella tersa (Gestro, 1897)
- Agoniella vandepollii (Gestro, 1897)
