= Agoniella crassipes =

Scientific classification
- Kingdom: Animalia
- Phylum: Arthropoda
- Class: Insecta
- Order: Coleoptera
- Suborder: Polyphaga
- Infraorder: Cucujiformia
- Family: Chrysomelidae
- Genus: Agoniella
- Species: A. crassipes

Binomial name
- Agoniella crassipes (Baly, 1878)

Synonyms
- Gonophora crassipes Baly, 1878

Species of beetle

Agoniella crassipes is a species of beetle of the family Chrysomelidae. It is found in New Guinea.

== Life history ==
No host plant has been documented for this species.
