= Downesia bambusae =

Scientific classification
- Kingdom: Animalia
- Phylum: Arthropoda
- Clade: Pancrustacea
- Class: Insecta
- Order: Coleoptera
- Suborder: Polyphaga
- Infraorder: Cucujiformia
- Family: Chrysomelidae
- Genus: Downesia
- Species: D. bambusae

Binomial name
- Downesia bambusae Maulik, 1933

Synonyms
- Downesia excelsa Spaeth, 1933

Species of beetle

Downesia bambusae is a species of beetle of the family Chrysomelidae. It is found in Indonesia (Java).

== Life history ==
The recorded host plants for this species are bamboo species (Poaceae).
