= Gonophora pulchella =

Scientific classification
- Kingdom: Animalia
- Phylum: Arthropoda
- Clade: Pancrustacea
- Class: Insecta
- Order: Coleoptera
- Suborder: Polyphaga
- Infraorder: Cucujiformia
- Family: Chrysomelidae
- Genus: Gonophora
- Species: G. pulchella

Binomial name
- Gonophora pulchella Gestro, 1888

Synonyms
- Gonophora bengalensis Weise, 1908; Gonophora pulchella clermonti Pic, 1927; Gonophora pulchella vitalisii Pic, 1930; Gonophora annamita Pic, 1930

Species of beetle

Gonophora pulchella is a species of beetle of the family Chrysomelidae. It is found in Bangladesh, Cambodia, China (Hainan, Yunnan), India (Annam, Assam, Manipur, Sikkim), Laos, Myanmar, Nepal, Thailand and Vietnam.

== Life history ==
The recorded host plants for this species are Canna indica, Hedychium coronarium, Alpinia pumila and Alpinia oxyphylla.
