= Klitispa rugicollis =

Scientific classification
- Kingdom: Animalia
- Phylum: Arthropoda
- Class: Insecta
- Order: Coleoptera
- Suborder: Polyphaga
- Infraorder: Cucujiformia
- Family: Chrysomelidae
- Genus: Klitispa
- Species: K. rugicollis

Binomial name
- Klitispa rugicollis (Gestro, 1890)

Synonyms
- Gonophora rugicollis Gestro, 1890

Species of beetle

Klitispa rugicollis is a species of beetle of the family Chrysomelidae. It is found in China (Fujian, Yunnan), Laos, Myanmar, Thailand and Vietnam.

== Life history ==
No host plant has been documented for this species.
