= Agoniella sonani =

Scientific classification
- Kingdom: Animalia
- Phylum: Arthropoda
- Class: Insecta
- Order: Coleoptera
- Suborder: Polyphaga
- Infraorder: Cucujiformia
- Family: Chrysomelidae
- Genus: Agoniella
- Species: A. sonani

Binomial name
- Agoniella sonani (Chûjô, 1933)

Synonyms
- Agonia sonani Chûjô, 1933

Species of beetle

Agoniella sonani is a species of beetle of the family Chrysomelidae. It is found in Taiwan.

== Life history ==
No host plant has been documented for this species.
