= Gonophora taylori =

Scientific classification
- Kingdom: Animalia
- Phylum: Arthropoda
- Clade: Pancrustacea
- Class: Insecta
- Order: Coleoptera
- Suborder: Polyphaga
- Infraorder: Cucujiformia
- Family: Chrysomelidae
- Genus: Gonophora
- Species: G. taylori

Binomial name
- Gonophora taylori Spaeth, 1933

Species of beetle

Gonophora taylori is a species of beetle of the family Chrysomelidae. It is found in Fiji and Indonesia (Sumatra).

== Life history ==
The recorded host plants for this species are Amomum species.
