= Gonophora bimaculata =

Scientific classification
- Kingdom: Animalia
- Phylum: Arthropoda
- Clade: Pancrustacea
- Class: Insecta
- Order: Coleoptera
- Suborder: Polyphaga
- Infraorder: Cucujiformia
- Family: Chrysomelidae
- Genus: Gonophora
- Species: G. bimaculata

Binomial name
- Gonophora bimaculata (Chapuis, 1876)

Synonyms
- Distolaca bimaculata Chapuis, 1876

Species of beetle

Gonophora bimaculata is a species of beetle of the family Chrysomelidae. It is found in the Philippines (Basilan, Leyte, Luzon, Mindanao, Palawan, Panaon, Samar, Siargao).

== Life history ==
No host plant has been documented for this species.
