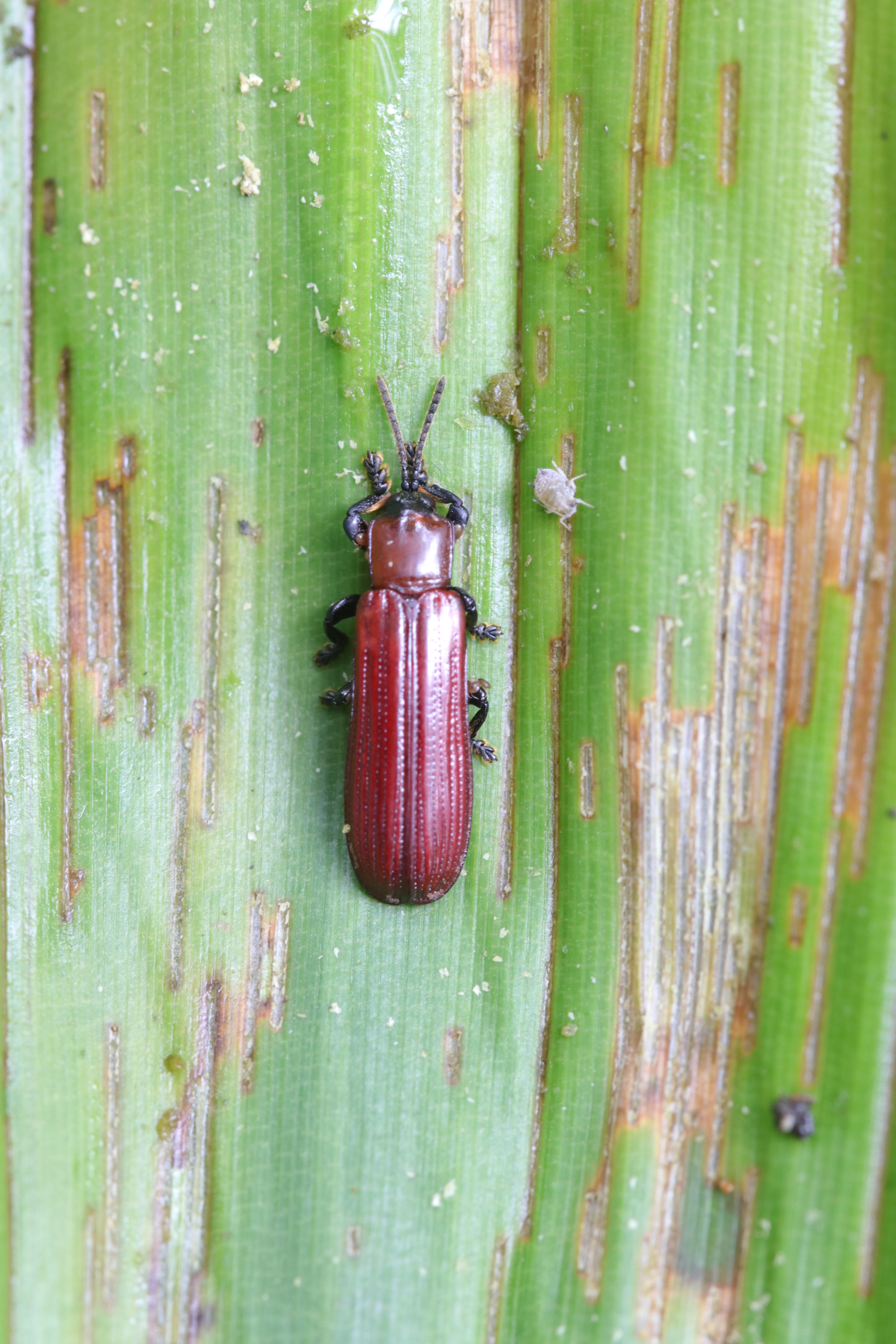

Scientific classification
- Kingdom: Animalia
- Phylum: Arthropoda
- Clade: Pancrustacea
- Class: Insecta
- Order: Coleoptera
- Suborder: Polyphaga
- Infraorder: Cucujiformia
- Family: Chrysomelidae
- Genus: Downesia
- Species: D. strandi

Binomial name
- Downesia strandi Uhmann, 1943

= Downesia strandi =

Species of beetle

Downesia strandi is a species of beetle of the family Chrysomelidae. It is found in China (Zhejiang).

== Life history ==
No host plant has been documented for this species.
