= Downesia marginicollis =

Scientific classification
- Kingdom: Animalia
- Phylum: Arthropoda
- Clade: Pancrustacea
- Class: Insecta
- Order: Coleoptera
- Suborder: Polyphaga
- Infraorder: Cucujiformia
- Family: Chrysomelidae
- Genus: Downesia
- Species: D. marginicollis

Binomial name
- Downesia marginicollis Weise, 1922

Species of beetle

Downesia marginicollis is a species of beetle of the family Chrysomelidae. It is found in China (Fujian, Guangdong).

== Life history ==
The recorded host plants for this species are Sinocalamus beecheyanus and Bambusa beechyana.
