= Downesia tarsata =

Scientific classification
- Kingdom: Animalia
- Phylum: Arthropoda
- Clade: Pancrustacea
- Class: Insecta
- Order: Coleoptera
- Suborder: Polyphaga
- Infraorder: Cucujiformia
- Family: Chrysomelidae
- Genus: Downesia
- Species: D. tarsata

Binomial name
- Downesia tarsata Baly, 1869

Species of beetle

Downesia tarsata is a species of beetle of the family Chrysomelidae. It is found in China (Hong Kong, Guangdong).

== Description ==
The thorax is slightly longer than in the similar species Downesia atrata, with the sides straight, obsoletely sinuate, nearly parallel and only slightly converging from the base to within a short distance of the apex, where they suddenly converge to the apex itself. The apical margin is slightly produced. The upper surface is finely and subremotely punctured. The elytra are sculptured as in Downesia atrata.

== Life history ==
The recorded host plant for this species is Saccharomyces indicus.
