= Monagonia =

Scientific classification
- Kingdom: Animalia
- Phylum: Arthropoda
- Class: Insecta
- Order: Coleoptera
- Suborder: Polyphaga
- Infraorder: Cucujiformia
- Family: Chrysomelidae
- Subfamily: Cassidinae
- Tribe: Gonophorini
- Genus: Monagonia; Uhmann, 1931

Genus of leaf beetles

Monagonia is a genus of beetles belonging to the family Chrysomelidae.

== Species ==
- Monagonia melanoptera Chen & Sun, 1964
- Monagonia serena (Weise, 1924)
