= Downesia gracilis =

Scientific classification
- Kingdom: Animalia
- Phylum: Arthropoda
- Class: Insecta
- Order: Coleoptera
- Suborder: Polyphaga
- Infraorder: Cucujiformia
- Family: Chrysomelidae
- Genus: Downesia
- Species: D. gracilis

Binomial name
- Downesia gracilis Uhmann, 1955

Species of beetle

Downesia gracilis is a species of beetle of the family Chrysomelidae. It is found in China (Fujian).

== Life history ==
No host plant has been documented for this species.
