= Downesia thoracica =

Scientific classification
- Kingdom: Animalia
- Phylum: Arthropoda
- Class: Insecta
- Order: Coleoptera
- Suborder: Polyphaga
- Infraorder: Cucujiformia
- Family: Chrysomelidae
- Genus: Downesia
- Species: D. thoracica

Binomial name
- Downesia thoracica Chen and Sun, 1964

Species of beetle

Downesia thoracica is a species of beetle of the family Chrysomelidae. It is found in China (Guangdong, Guangxi, Hubei, Yunnan).

== Life history ==
The recorded host plants for this species are Bambusa species.
