= Monagonia melanoptera =

Scientific classification
- Kingdom: Animalia
- Phylum: Arthropoda
- Class: Insecta
- Order: Coleoptera
- Suborder: Polyphaga
- Infraorder: Cucujiformia
- Family: Chrysomelidae
- Genus: Monagonia
- Species: M. melanoptera

Binomial name
- Monagonia melanoptera Chen & Sun, 1964

Species of beetle

Monagonia melanoptera is a species of beetle of the family Chrysomelidae. It is found in Vietnam.

== Life history ==
No host plant has been documented for this species.
