= Wallacispa =

Scientific classification
- Kingdom: Animalia
- Phylum: Arthropoda
- Class: Insecta
- Order: Coleoptera
- Suborder: Polyphaga
- Infraorder: Cucujiformia
- Family: Chrysomelidae
- Subfamily: Cassidinae
- Tribe: Gonophorini
- Genus: Wallacispa; Uhmann, 1940

Genus of leaf beetles

Wallacispa is a genus of beetles belonging to the family Chrysomelidae.

== Species ==
- Wallacispa javana Uhmann, 1955
- Wallacispa tibialis Uhmann, 1940
