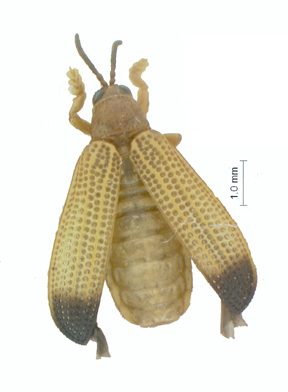

Scientific classification
- Kingdom: Animalia
- Phylum: Arthropoda
- Class: Insecta
- Order: Coleoptera
- Suborder: Polyphaga
- Infraorder: Cucujiformia
- Family: Chrysomelidae
- Genus: Monagonia
- Species: M. serena

Binomial name
- Monagonia serena (Weise, 1924)

Synonyms
- Agonia serena Weise, 1924

= Monagonia serena =

Species of beetle

Monagonia serena is a species of beetle of the family Chrysomelidae. It is found in Indonesia (Sumatra).

== Life history ==
No host plant has been documented for this species.
