= Downesia =

Scientific classification
- Kingdom: Animalia
- Phylum: Arthropoda
- Clade: Pancrustacea
- Class: Insecta
- Order: Coleoptera
- Suborder: Polyphaga
- Infraorder: Cucujiformia
- Family: Chrysomelidae
- Subfamily: Cassidinae
- Tribe: Gonophorini
- Genus: Downesia; Baly, 1858

Synonyms
- Hanoia Fairmaire, 1888

Genus of leaf beetles

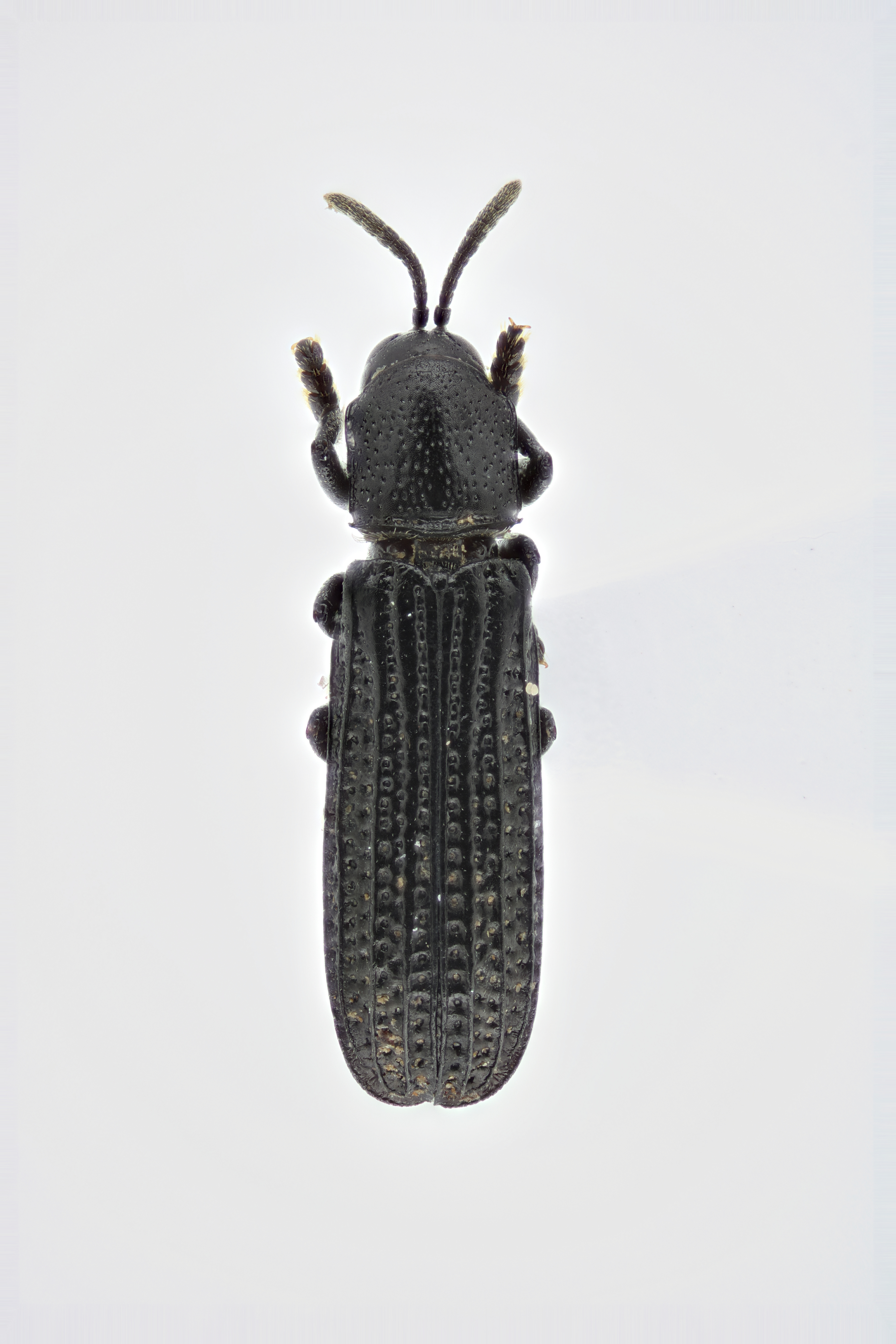

Downesia is a genus of beetles belonging to the family Chrysomelidae.

== Species ==
- Downesia abdominalis Weise, 1922
- Downesia andrewesi Gestro, 1911
- Downesia atrata Baly, 1869
- Downesia auberti (Fairmaire, 1888)
- Downesia balyi Gressitt, 1950
- Downesia bambusae Maulik, 1933
- Downesia basalis Baly, 1888
- Downesia ceylonica Maulik, 1919
- Downesia elegans Gestro, 1890
- Downesia fulvipennis Baly, 1888
- Downesia garambae Uhmann, 1961
- Downesia gestroi Baly, 1888
- Downesia gracilis Uhmann, 1955
- Downesia grandis Gestro, 1890
- Downesia insignis Baly, 1858
- Downesia javana Weise, 1928
- Downesia kanarensis Weise, 1897
- Downesia kwangtunga Gressitt, 1950
- Downesia labrata Uhmann, 1948
- Downesia linkei Uhmann, 1963
- Downesia maculaticeps Pic, 1924
- Downesia major Pic, 1934
- Downesia marginicollis Weise, 1922
- Downesia negrosica Uhmann, 1948
- Downesia nigripennis Chen and Tan, 1962
- Downesia perniciosa Spaeth, 1933
- Downesia picea Baly, 1888
- Downesia puncticollis Chen and Tan, 1962
- Downesia ratana Maulik, 1919
- Downesia sasthi Maulik, 1923
- Downesia simulans Chen and Sun, 1964
- Downesia spenceri Kimoto, 1998
- Downesia strandi Uhmann, 1943
- Downesia strigicollis Baly, 1876
- Downesia strigosa Pic, 1924
- Downesia sulcata Fleutiaux, 1877
- Downesia sumatrana Gestro, 1897
- Downesia tagalica Gestro, 1917
- Downesia tarsata Baly, 1869
- Downesia thoracica Chen and Sun, 1964
- Downesia vandykei Gressitt, 1939

== Selected former species ==
- Downesia atripes Pic, 1928
- Downesia donckieri Pic, 1924
