= Downesia sasthi =

Scientific classification
- Kingdom: Animalia
- Phylum: Arthropoda
- Class: Insecta
- Order: Coleoptera
- Suborder: Polyphaga
- Infraorder: Cucujiformia
- Family: Chrysomelidae
- Genus: Downesia
- Species: D. sasthi

Binomial name
- Downesia sasthi Maulik, 1923

Species of beetle

Downesia sasthi is a species of beetle of the family Chrysomelidae. It is found in China (Yunnan).

== Life history ==
The recorded host plant for this species is Thysanolaena agrostis.
