= Gonophora coomani =

Scientific classification
- Kingdom: Animalia
- Phylum: Arthropoda
- Clade: Pancrustacea
- Class: Insecta
- Order: Coleoptera
- Suborder: Polyphaga
- Infraorder: Cucujiformia
- Family: Chrysomelidae
- Genus: Gonophora
- Species: G. coomani

Binomial name
- Gonophora coomani Pic, 1930

Synonyms
- Gonophora innotata coomani Pic, 1930

Species of beetle

Gonophora coomani is a species of beetle of the family Chrysomelidae. It is found in Laos, Thailand and Vietnam.

== Life history ==
No host plant has been documented for this species.
