= Agoniella longula =

Scientific classification
- Kingdom: Animalia
- Phylum: Arthropoda
- Class: Insecta
- Order: Coleoptera
- Suborder: Polyphaga
- Infraorder: Cucujiformia
- Family: Chrysomelidae
- Genus: Agoniella
- Species: A. longula

Binomial name
- Agoniella longula (Gestro, 1917)

Synonyms
- Agonia longula Gestro, 1917

Species of beetle

Agoniella longula is a species of beetle of the family Chrysomelidae. It is found in the Philippines (Luzon, Mindanao, Mindoro, Panay).

== Life history ==
No host plant has been documented for this species.
