= Downesia elegans =

Scientific classification
- Kingdom: Animalia
- Phylum: Arthropoda
- Class: Insecta
- Order: Coleoptera
- Suborder: Polyphaga
- Infraorder: Cucujiformia
- Family: Chrysomelidae
- Genus: Downesia
- Species: D. elegans

Binomial name
- Downesia elegans Gestro, 1890

Species of beetle

Downesia elegans is a species of beetle of the family Chrysomelidae. It is found in Myanmar.

== Life history ==
No host plant has been documented for this species.
