= Downesia labrata =

Scientific classification
- Kingdom: Animalia
- Phylum: Arthropoda
- Clade: Pancrustacea
- Class: Insecta
- Order: Coleoptera
- Suborder: Polyphaga
- Infraorder: Cucujiformia
- Family: Chrysomelidae
- Genus: Downesia
- Species: D. labrata

Binomial name
- Downesia labrata Uhmann, 1948

Species of beetle

Downesia labrata is a species of beetle of the family Chrysomelidae. It is found in Indonesia (Java).

== Life history ==
No host plant has been documented for this species.
