= Agoniella biformis =

Scientific classification
- Kingdom: Animalia
- Phylum: Arthropoda
- Class: Insecta
- Order: Coleoptera
- Suborder: Polyphaga
- Infraorder: Cucujiformia
- Family: Chrysomelidae
- Genus: Agoniella
- Species: A. biformis

Binomial name
- Agoniella biformis (Uhmann, 1932)

Synonyms
- Agonia (Agoniella) biformis Uhmann, 1932

Species of beetle

Agoniella biformis is a species of beetle of the family Chrysomelidae. It is found in the Philippines (Mindanao, Negros, Samar).

== Life history ==
No host plant has been documented for this species.
