= Agoniella apicalis =

Scientific classification
- Kingdom: Animalia
- Phylum: Arthropoda
- Clade: Pancrustacea
- Class: Insecta
- Order: Coleoptera
- Suborder: Polyphaga
- Infraorder: Cucujiformia
- Family: Chrysomelidae
- Genus: Agoniella
- Species: A. apicalis

Binomial name
- Agoniella apicalis (Baly, 1858)

Synonyms
- Distolaca apicalis Baly, 1858

Species of beetle

Agoniella apicalis is a species of beetle of the family Chrysomelidae. It is found in Indonesia (Sulawesi) and the Philippines (Luzon, Mindanao).

== Description ==
Adults are elongate, subconvex and slightly flattened along the suture. The elytra are bicostate and pale fulvous, while the antennae (their base excepted), eyes, and apex of the abdomen are black. The head is smooth, shining and impunctate. The thorax is transverse, the sides straight and nearly parallel behind, rounded and narrowed in front, above convex, with the anterior border cylindrical, separated from the disc by a deep groove. The disc is shining, deeply and irregularly pitted, more especially behind, the excavated portions deeply punctured. The scutellum is smooth and shining. The elytra are broader than the thorax, the sides parallel, the apex rounded and the apical margin finely serrate, above subconvex, slightly flattened along the suture. Each elytron has two strongly elevated costae, their interspaces deeply impressed with a double row of large punctures, the interstices transversely costulate, pale fusco-fulvous, the apex black.

== Life history ==
No host plant has been documented for this species.
