= Downesia atrata =

Scientific classification
- Kingdom: Animalia
- Phylum: Arthropoda
- Class: Insecta
- Order: Coleoptera
- Suborder: Polyphaga
- Infraorder: Cucujiformia
- Family: Chrysomelidae
- Genus: Downesia
- Species: D. atrata

Binomial name
- Downesia atrata Baly, 1869

Species of beetle

Downesia atrata is a species of beetle of the family Chrysomelidae. It is found in Bangladesh, China (Yunnan), India (Assam, Sikkim), Myanmar and Nepal.

== Description ==
The antennae are scarcely longer than the head and thorax, slightly increasing in thickness towards the apex. The thorax is narrowly margined, with the sides straight and parallel, obliquely narrowed at their extreme apex and with the apical margin slightly produced. The elytra are scarcely broader than the thorax, the sides straight and parallel, their apex regularly rounded. The upper surface of each has three strongly raised longitudinal costae and the sutural and lateral borders are also costate, the interspaces each with a double row of large deeply-impressed punctures. On the middle portion of the outer, the anterior four-fifths of the inner, and on the extreme base of the middle interspaces, the double rows of punctures become single.

== Life history ==
No host plant has been documented for this species.
