= Gonophora haemorrhoidalis =

Scientific classification
- Kingdom: Animalia
- Phylum: Arthropoda
- Clade: Pancrustacea
- Class: Insecta
- Order: Coleoptera
- Suborder: Polyphaga
- Infraorder: Cucujiformia
- Family: Chrysomelidae
- Genus: Gonophora
- Species: G. haemorrhoidalis

Binomial name
- Gonophora haemorrhoidalis (Weber, 1801)

Synonyms
- Hispa haemorrhoidalis Weber, 1801; Gonophora harmorrhoidalis atripennis Weise, 1924; Gonophora harmorrhoidalis niasensis Gestro, 1897; Gonophora harmorrhoidalis undulata Weise, 1905

Species of beetle

Gonophora haemorrhoidalis is a species of beetle of the family Chrysomelidae. It is found in Indonesia (Borneo, Java, Sumatra) and Malaysia.

== Description ==
Adults are broadly elongate, slightly wider behind and shining testaceous. The elytra (their extreme apex excepted) and antennae are black. The head is smooth and the basal joint of the antennae and eyes are rufo-piceous. The thorax is broader at the base than long, its apex narrowly strangulated, the sides margined, straight and indistinctly sinuate behind, narrowed and deeply sinuate in front. The margin is produced and angled near the middle, its outer border finely serrate. The disc is convex, thickened and rugose-punctate, longitudinally grooved down the middle, the hinder portion deeply impressed with a transverse excavation, which extends on either side obliquely upwards nearly to the anterior angles, the extreme base transversely grooved. The scutellum is smooth, its apex blackish-piceous. The elytra are broader than the thorax, slightly increasing in width to the posterior angles, the apex obtusely rounded, posterior angles distinct and obtuse, the sides nearly parallel, their entire margin distinctly serrate, above subdepressed along the back. Each elytron has three elevated costae, the upper margins of which are deeply undulate, the edge itself being coarsely serrate, the intermediate costa is nearly obsolete in the middle, the interspaces impressed with three or more rows of deep punctures, their interstices transversely costulate, black. There is a transverse apical spot, and, more rarely, a patch at the extreme base, testaceous.

== Life history ==
The recorded host plants for this species are Amomum species.
