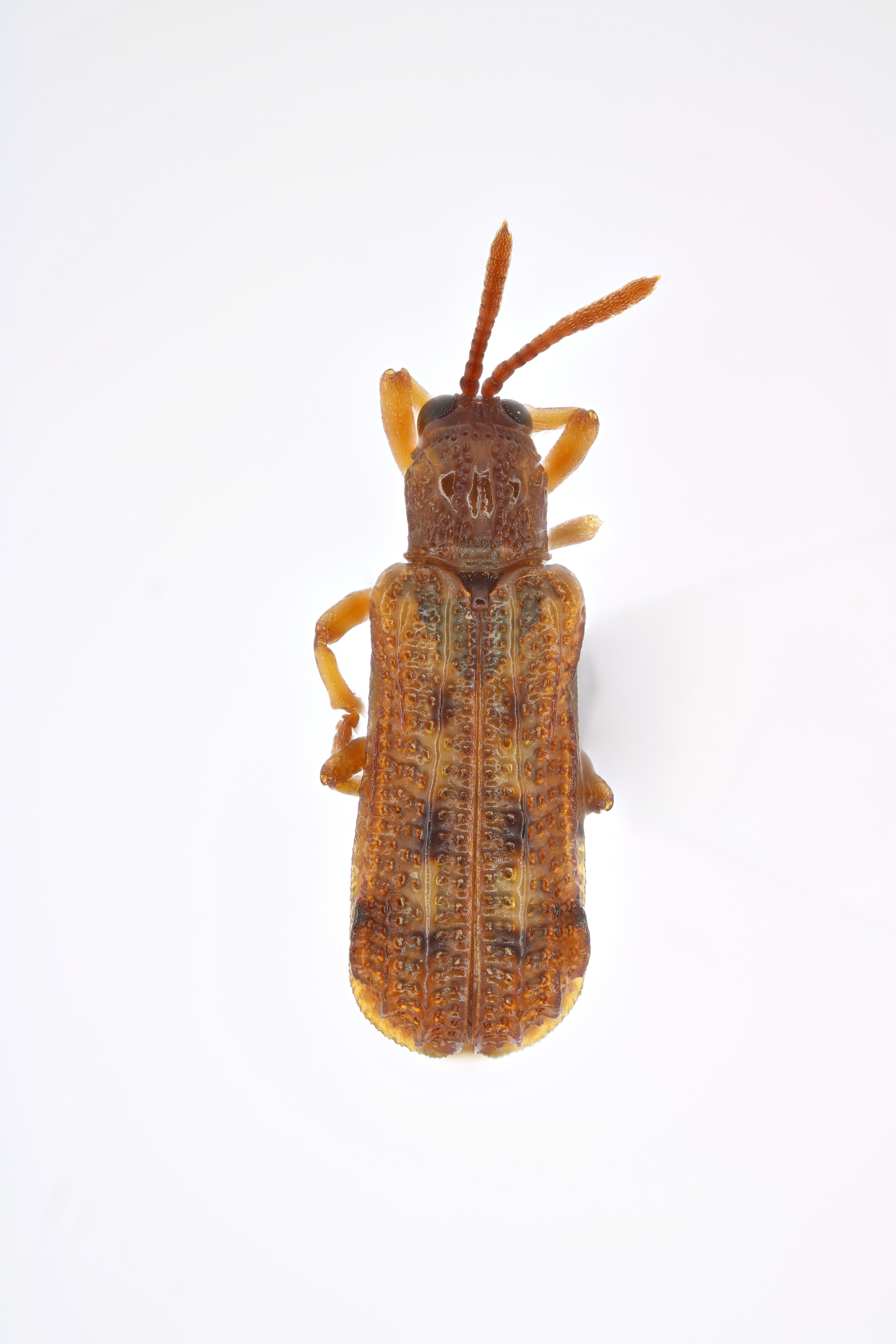
- Agonita sp.

Scientific classification
- Kingdom: Animalia
- Phylum: Arthropoda
- Class: Insecta
- Order: Coleoptera
- Suborder: Polyphaga
- Infraorder: Cucujiformia
- Family: Chrysomelidae
- Subfamily: Cassidinae
- Tribe: Gonophorini; Chapuis, 1875

Genera
- see text

Synonyms
- Wallaceites Chapuis, 1877

= Gonophorini =

Tribe of leaf beetles

Gonophorini is a tribe of leaf beetle genera, mostly found in Africa and Asia, within the subfamily Cassidinae.

== Genera ==
BioLib includes:

1. Agoniella Weise, 1911
2. Agonita Strand, 1942
3. Aspidispa Baly, 1869
4. Downesia Baly, 1858
5. Gonophora Chevrolat, 1837
6. Klitispa Uhmann, 1940
7. Micrispa Gestro, 1897
8. Monagonia Uhmann, 1931
9. Wallacispa Uhmann, 1940
10. †Electrolema Schaufuss, 1898 monotypic † E. baltica Schaufuss, 1898, described from Baltic amber.

== Selected former genera ==
- Wallacea Baly, 1858
