= Nicolaia =

Scientific classification
- Kingdom: Animalia
- Phylum: Mollusca
- Class: Gastropoda
- Subclass: Caenogastropoda
- Order: Littorinimorpha
- Family: Hydrobiidae
- Subfamily: Shadiniinae
- Genus: Nicolaia; Glöer, Bößneck, Walther & Neiber, 2016
- Species: N. schniebsae

Binomial name
- Nicolaia schniebsae Glöer & Bößneck, 2016

Species of gastropod

Nicolaia schniebsae is a species of small freshwater snails with a gill and an operculum, an aquatic gastropod mollusc in the family Hydrobiidae.

Nicolaia schniebsae is the type species of the genus Nicolaia and it is the only species within the genus.

== Distribution ==
Armenia
