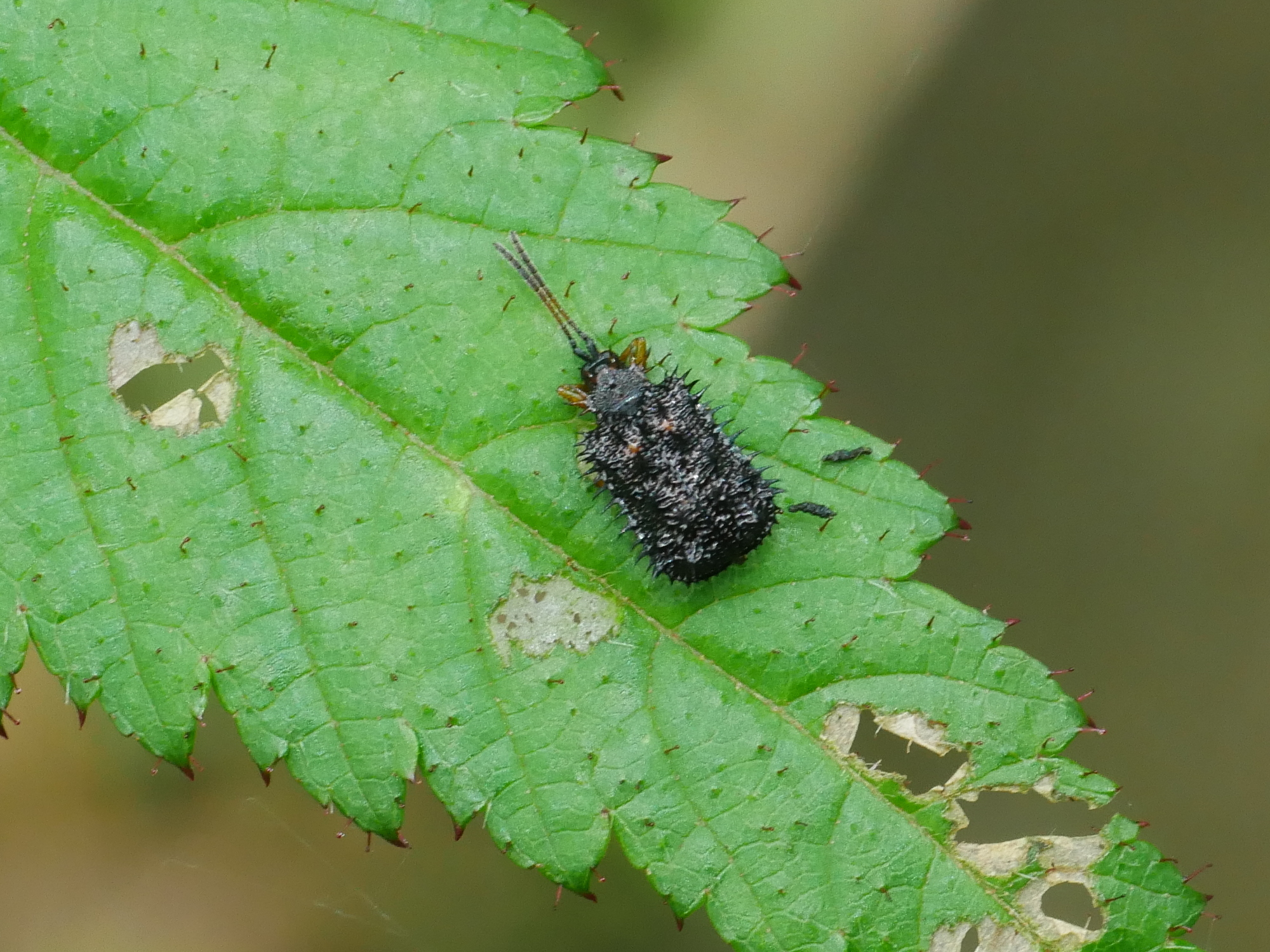

Scientific classification
- Kingdom: Animalia
- Phylum: Arthropoda
- Class: Insecta
- Order: Coleoptera
- Suborder: Polyphaga
- Infraorder: Cucujiformia
- Family: Chrysomelidae
- Genus: Dactylispa
- Species: D. chinensis

Binomial name
- Dactylispa chinensis Weise, 1905

Synonyms
- Dactylispa bindusara Maulik 1919; Dactylispa insulicola Chûjô, 1933; Dactylispa gestroi Gressitt, 1938

= Dactylispa chinensis =

Species of beetle

Dactylispa chinensis is a species of beetle of the family Chrysomelidae. It is found in China (Fujian, Guangxi, Guizhou, Hainan, Hubei, Hunan, Jiangxi, Guangdong, Sichuan, Yunnan).

== Life history ==
No host plant has been documented for this species.
