= Agonita nigriceps =

Scientific classification
- Kingdom: Animalia
- Phylum: Arthropoda
- Class: Insecta
- Order: Coleoptera
- Suborder: Polyphaga
- Infraorder: Cucujiformia
- Family: Chrysomelidae
- Genus: Agonita
- Species: A. nigriceps

Binomial name
- Agonita nigriceps (Baly, 1869)

Synonyms
- Gonophora nigriceps Baly, 1869

Species of beetle

Agonita nigriceps is a species of beetle of the family Chrysomelidae. It is found in Malaysia and Thailand.

== Description ==
Adults are very similar to Agonita saundersi, but can be distinguished by the narrower and more parallel lateral margin of the elytra, and also by the interspaces on the disc having each (the middle one at the base excepted) a double row of punctures.

== Life history ==
No host plant has been documented for this species.
