= Dactylispa parbatya =

Scientific classification
- Kingdom: Animalia
- Phylum: Arthropoda
- Class: Insecta
- Order: Coleoptera
- Suborder: Polyphaga
- Infraorder: Cucujiformia
- Family: Chrysomelidae
- Genus: Dactylispa
- Species: D. parbatya

Binomial name
- Dactylispa parbatya Maulik, 1919

Synonyms
- Dactylispa xanthopus Maulik, 1918 (preocc.)

Species of beetle

Dactylispa parbatya is a species of beetle of the family Chrysomelidae. It is found in Bangladesh, China (Fujian, Yunnan), India (Uttar Pradesh, Sikkim, Tamil Nadu, West Bengal), Myanmar and Nepal.

== Life history ==
The recorded host plants for this species are Rubus species.
