= Dactylispa lohita =

Scientific classification
- Kingdom: Animalia
- Phylum: Arthropoda
- Class: Insecta
- Order: Coleoptera
- Suborder: Polyphaga
- Infraorder: Cucujiformia
- Family: Chrysomelidae
- Genus: Dactylispa
- Species: D. lohita

Binomial name
- Dactylispa lohita Maulik, 1919

Species of beetle

Dactylispa lohita is a species of beetle of the family Chrysomelidae. It is found in Bangladesh, Bhutan, China (Xizang), India (Assam, Manipur, Meghalaya, Punjab, Uttar Pradesh, West Bengal) and Nepal.

== Life history ==
No host plant has been documented for this species.
