= Agonita cherapunjiensis =

Scientific classification
- Kingdom: Animalia
- Phylum: Arthropoda
- Class: Insecta
- Order: Coleoptera
- Suborder: Polyphaga
- Infraorder: Cucujiformia
- Family: Chrysomelidae
- Genus: Agonita
- Species: A. cherapunjiensis

Binomial name
- Agonita cherapunjiensis (Maulik, 1916)

Synonyms
- Agonia cherapujiensis Maulik, 1916

Species of beetle

Agonita cherapunjiensis is a species of beetle of the family Chrysomelidae. It is found in Bangladesh.

== Life history ==
No host plant has been documented for this species.
