= Agonita nilava =

Scientific classification
- Kingdom: Animalia
- Phylum: Arthropoda
- Class: Insecta
- Order: Coleoptera
- Suborder: Polyphaga
- Infraorder: Cucujiformia
- Family: Chrysomelidae
- Genus: Agonita
- Species: A. nilava

Binomial name
- Agonita nilava (Maulik, 1919)

Synonyms
- Agonia nilava Maulik, 1919

Species of beetle

Agonita nilava is a species of beetle of the family Chrysomelidae. It is found in Myanmar.

== Life history ==
No host plant has been documented for this species.
