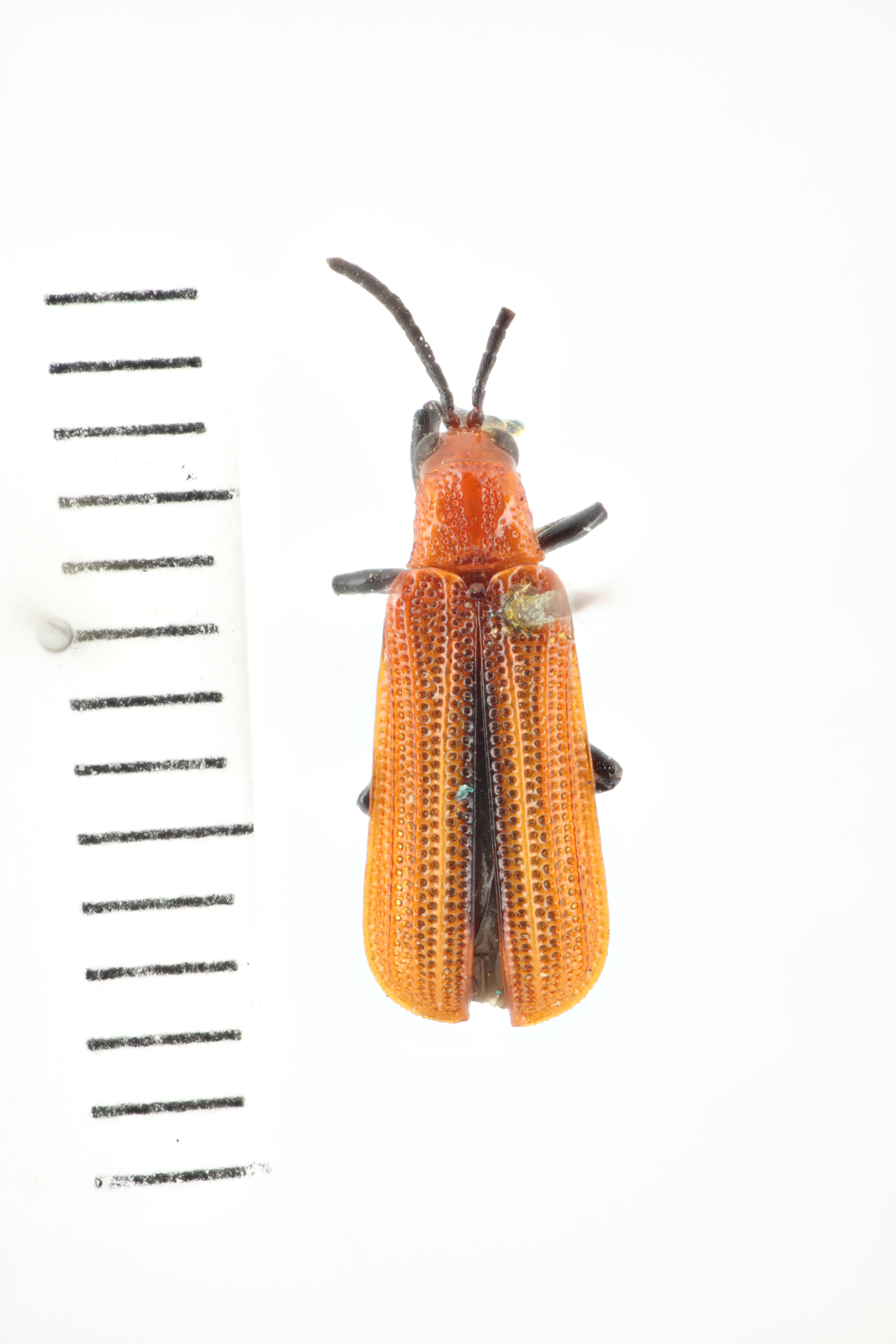

Scientific classification
- Kingdom: Animalia
- Phylum: Arthropoda
- Class: Insecta
- Order: Coleoptera
- Suborder: Polyphaga
- Infraorder: Cucujiformia
- Family: Chrysomelidae
- Genus: Agonita
- Species: A. suturellamima

Binomial name
- Agonita suturellamima (Maulik, 1919)

Synonyms
- Agonia suturellamima Maulik, 1919

= Agonita suturellamima =

Species of beetle

Agonita suturellamima is a species of beetle of the family Chrysomelidae. It is found in India (Madras).

== Life history ==
No host plant has been documented for this species.
