= Dactylispa nalika =

Scientific classification
- Kingdom: Animalia
- Phylum: Arthropoda
- Clade: Pancrustacea
- Class: Insecta
- Order: Coleoptera
- Suborder: Polyphaga
- Infraorder: Cucujiformia
- Family: Chrysomelidae
- Genus: Dactylispa
- Species: D. nalika

Binomial name
- Dactylispa nalika Maulik, 1919

Species of beetle

Dactylispa nalika is a species of beetle of the family Chrysomelidae. It is found in India (Maharashtra, Tamil Nadu).

== Life history ==
No host plant has been documented for this species.
