= Dactylispa javaensis =

Scientific classification
- Kingdom: Animalia
- Phylum: Arthropoda
- Class: Insecta
- Order: Coleoptera
- Suborder: Polyphaga
- Infraorder: Cucujiformia
- Family: Chrysomelidae
- Genus: Dactylispa
- Species: D. javaensis

Binomial name
- Dactylispa javaensis Maulik, 1931

Species of beetle

Dactylispa javaensis is a species of beetle of the family Chrysomelidae. It is found in Indonesia (Java) and Malaysia.

== Life history ==
The recorded host plants for this species are Gardenia species.
