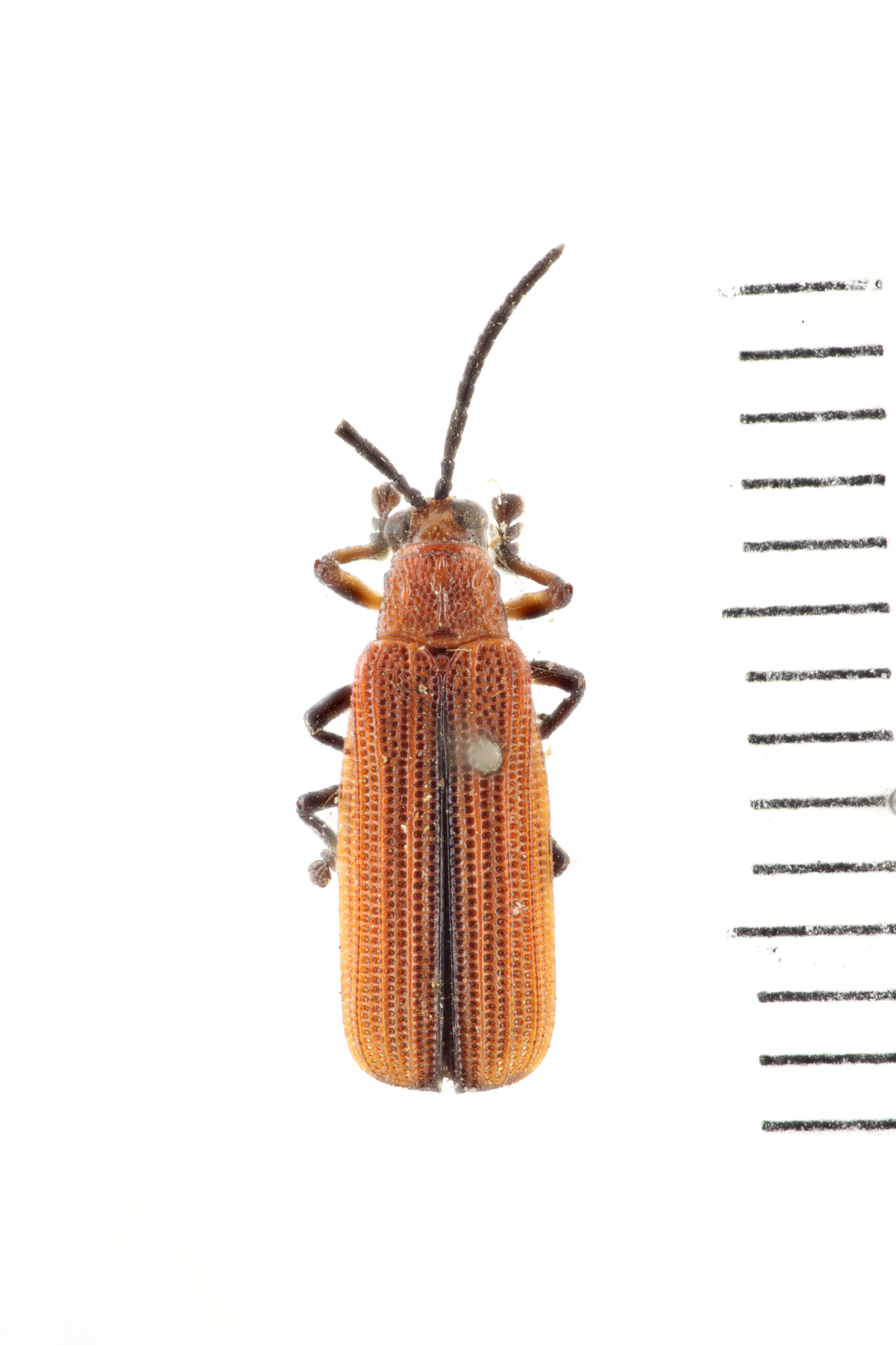

Scientific classification
- Kingdom: Animalia
- Phylum: Arthropoda
- Clade: Pancrustacea
- Class: Insecta
- Order: Coleoptera
- Suborder: Polyphaga
- Infraorder: Cucujiformia
- Family: Chrysomelidae
- Genus: Agonita
- Species: A. suturella

Binomial name
- Agonita suturella (Baly, 1858)

Synonyms
- Gonophora suturella Baly, 1858

= Agonita suturella =

Species of beetle

Agonita suturella is a species of beetle of the family Chrysomelidae. It is found in India (Madras, Mysore), Indonesia (Java, Sumatra), Laos and Malaysia.

== Description ==
Adults are red above, with the antennae, eyes, and sometimes also the surface immediately around the latter, the extreme lateral margin of the thorax, a narrow sutural line, and the extreme apex of the elytra black. The antennae are long and slender. The thorax similar in form and sculpture to that of Agonita wallacei, but without the black central longitudinal line. The elytra is narrower, less dilated on the sides, and more parallel, the interspaces between the costae impressed with two regular rows of deep punctures, the intermediate interstices on the sides and near the apex not distinctly elevated.

== Life history ==
The recorded host plants for this species are Pandanus species.
