= Dactylispa chaturanga =

Scientific classification
- Kingdom: Animalia
- Phylum: Arthropoda
- Class: Insecta
- Order: Coleoptera
- Suborder: Polyphaga
- Infraorder: Cucujiformia
- Family: Chrysomelidae
- Genus: Dactylispa
- Species: D. chaturanga

Binomial name
- Dactylispa chaturanga Maulik, 1919

Species of beetle

Dactylispa chaturanga is a species of beetle of the family Chrysomelidae. It is found in China (Guangdong, Hunan, Sichuan), India, Myanmar, Thailand and Vietnam.

== Life history ==
The recorded host plants for this species are Malus sylvestris and Rubus species.
