= Agonita testaceicornis =

Scientific classification
- Kingdom: Animalia
- Phylum: Arthropoda
- Class: Insecta
- Order: Coleoptera
- Suborder: Polyphaga
- Infraorder: Cucujiformia
- Family: Chrysomelidae
- Genus: Agonita
- Species: A. testaceicornis

Binomial name
- Agonita testaceicornis (Pic, 1942)

Synonyms
- Agonia testaceicornis Pic, 1942

Species of beetle

Agonita testaceicornis is a species of beetle of the family Chrysomelidae. It is found in Cameroon.

== Life history ==
No host plant has been documented for this species.
