= Agonita interrupta =

Scientific classification
- Kingdom: Animalia
- Phylum: Arthropoda
- Class: Insecta
- Order: Coleoptera
- Suborder: Polyphaga
- Infraorder: Cucujiformia
- Family: Chrysomelidae
- Genus: Agonita
- Species: A. interrupta

Binomial name
- Agonita interrupta (Duvivier, 1891)

Synonyms
- Gonophora interrupta Duvivier, 1891; Agonia interrupta lineatocollis Weise 1913

Species of beetle

Agonita interrupta is a species of beetle of the family Chrysomelidae. It is found in the Democratic Republic of the Congo.

== Life history ==
No host plant has been documented for this species.
