= Agonita variegata =

Scientific classification
- Kingdom: Animalia
- Phylum: Arthropoda
- Class: Insecta
- Order: Coleoptera
- Suborder: Polyphaga
- Infraorder: Cucujiformia
- Family: Chrysomelidae
- Genus: Agonita
- Species: A. variegata

Binomial name
- Agonita variegata (Gestro, 1907)

Synonyms
- Distolaca variegata Gestro, 1907

Species of beetle

Agonita variegata is a species of beetle of the family Chrysomelidae. It is found in Kenya and Senegal.

== Life history ==
The recorded host plants for this species are Rubiaceae species.
