= Agonita quadripunctata =

Scientific classification
- Kingdom: Animalia
- Phylum: Arthropoda
- Clade: Pancrustacea
- Class: Insecta
- Order: Coleoptera
- Suborder: Polyphaga
- Infraorder: Cucujiformia
- Family: Chrysomelidae
- Genus: Agonita
- Species: A. quadripunctata

Binomial name
- Agonita quadripunctata (Guérin-Méneville in Cuvier, 1844)

Synonyms
- Odontota quadripunctata Guérin-Méneville in Cuvier, 1844

Species of beetle

Agonita quadripunctata is a species of beetle of the family Chrysomelidae. It is found in Cameroon, Congo, Equatorial Guinea, Guinea, Nigeria, Senegal, Sierra Leone, South Africa, Togo and Zimbabwe.

== Life history ==
The recorded host plants for this species are Poaceae species.
