= Agonita angulata =

Scientific classification
- Kingdom: Animalia
- Phylum: Arthropoda
- Class: Insecta
- Order: Coleoptera
- Suborder: Polyphaga
- Infraorder: Cucujiformia
- Family: Chrysomelidae
- Genus: Agonita
- Species: A. angulata

Binomial name
- Agonita angulata (Chen & Tan, 1962)

Synonyms
- Gonophora (Sinagonia) angulata Chen & Tan, 1962

Species of beetle

Agonita angulata is a species of beetle of the family Chrysomelidae. It is found in China (Yunnan).

== Life history ==
No host plant has been documented for this species.
