= Agonita dangali =

Scientific classification
- Kingdom: Animalia
- Phylum: Arthropoda
- Class: Insecta
- Order: Coleoptera
- Suborder: Polyphaga
- Infraorder: Cucujiformia
- Family: Chrysomelidae
- Genus: Agonita
- Species: A. dangali

Binomial name
- Agonita dangali Medvedev, 2009

Species of beetle

Agonita dangali is a species of beetle of the family Chrysomelidae. It is found in India (West Bengal).

== Life history ==
No host plant has been documented for this species.
