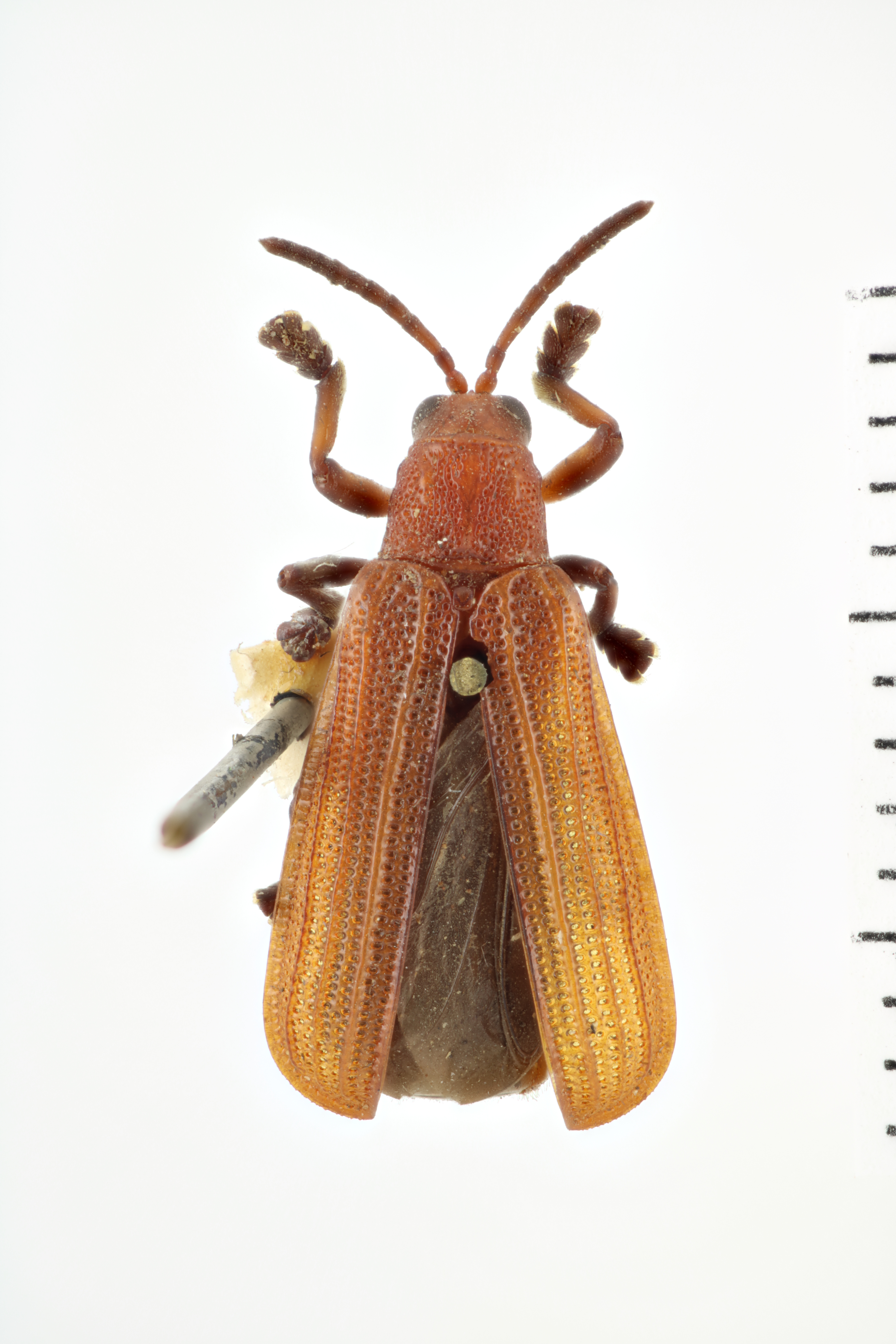

Scientific classification
- Kingdom: Animalia
- Phylum: Arthropoda
- Class: Insecta
- Order: Coleoptera
- Suborder: Polyphaga
- Infraorder: Cucujiformia
- Family: Chrysomelidae
- Genus: Agonita
- Species: A. fuscipes

Binomial name
- Agonita fuscipes (Baly, 1858)

Synonyms
- Gonophora fuscipes Baly, 1858

= Agonita fuscipes =

Species of beetle

Agonita fuscipes is a species of beetle of the family Chrysomelidae. It is found in India (Kerala).

== Description ==
Adults are elongate, subdepressed and shining fulvo-testaceous. The antennae and legs are rufo-piceous and the head is smooth. The thorax is broader at the base than long, narrowed from the base to the apex, the sides trisinuate and the apical border straight and narrowly margined, above convex, subcylindiical in front, transversely impressed at the base, rugose-punctate, a broad line down the middle, abbreviated towards the base and obsoletely grooved above, and an oblong longitudinal space on either side, slightly raised, impunctate. The scutellum is smooth and impunctate. The elytra are broader than the thorax, the sides parallel and narrowly margined, the apex regularly rounded, apical margin obsoletely serrulate, above subdepressed, moderately convex along the sides. Each elytron has three elevated costae, the interspaces impressed with a double row of deep punctures, the second interspace at its base and also the outer one towards its apex irregularly punctate.

== Life history ==
The recorded host plants for this species are Pandanus species.
