= Agonita weberi =

Scientific classification
- Kingdom: Animalia
- Phylum: Arthropoda
- Class: Insecta
- Order: Coleoptera
- Suborder: Polyphaga
- Infraorder: Cucujiformia
- Family: Chrysomelidae
- Genus: Agonita
- Species: A. weberi

Binomial name
- Agonita weberi (Weise, 1911)

Synonyms
- Agonia weberi Weise, 1911

Species of beetle

Agonita weberi is a species of beetle of the family Chrysomelidae. It is found in the Philippines (Palawan).

== Life history ==
No host plant has been documented for this species.
