= Agonita tricolor =

Scientific classification
- Kingdom: Animalia
- Phylum: Arthropoda
- Class: Insecta
- Order: Coleoptera
- Suborder: Polyphaga
- Infraorder: Cucujiformia
- Family: Chrysomelidae
- Genus: Agonita
- Species: A. tricolor

Binomial name
- Agonita tricolor (Chûjô, 1933)

Synonyms
- Agonia tricolor Chûjô, 1933

Species of beetle

Agonita tricolor is a species of beetle of the family Chrysomelidae. It is found in Taiwan.

== Description ==
Adults reach a length of about 4.9–6.3 mm. They are yellowish-brown or reddish-brown, while the antennae are black or blackish-brown and the legs are pale yellow.

== Life history ==
The recorded host plants for this species are Smilax china, Smilax bracteata and Smilax lanceifolia.
