= Agonita apicipennis =

Scientific classification
- Kingdom: Animalia
- Phylum: Arthropoda
- Class: Insecta
- Order: Coleoptera
- Suborder: Polyphaga
- Infraorder: Cucujiformia
- Family: Chrysomelidae
- Genus: Agonita
- Species: A. apicipennis

Binomial name
- Agonita apicipennis (Baly, 1869)

Synonyms
- Gonophora apicipennis Baly, 1869

Species of beetle

Agonita apicipennis is a species of beetle of the family Chrysomelidae. It is found in Sri Lanka.

== Description ==
The antennae are nearly half the length of the body, the third joint slender and elongate. The head is shining, the forehead impressed with a deep fovea. The eyes and mandibles are black. The thorax is rather broader at the base than long, with the sides straight, converging from the base to the apex, feebly bisinuate, notched at the apex and with the hinder angles acute. The surface is closely rugose, deeply impressed at the base with a transverse groove. On the middle of the disc are three short shining elevated vittae, the two outer ones oblique. The elytra are broader than the thorax, slightly dilated posteriorly, the apex regularly rounded, the upper surface flattened along the suture, the apical third entirely black. Each elytron is strongly tricostate, the basal margin also thickened, the three inner interspaces, as well as the hinder half of the fourth, each with a row of punctures. The anterior half of the fourth interspace is impressed with a double row only. The thorax is stained on either side beneath with an oblong black vitta.

== Life history ==
No host plant has been documented for this species.
