= Agonita limbata =

Scientific classification
- Kingdom: Animalia
- Phylum: Arthropoda
- Class: Insecta
- Order: Coleoptera
- Suborder: Polyphaga
- Infraorder: Cucujiformia
- Family: Chrysomelidae
- Genus: Agonita
- Species: A. limbata

Binomial name
- Agonita limbata (Pic, 1927)

Synonyms
- Agonia laticeps Pic, 1927

Species of beetle

Agonita limbata is a species of beetle of the family Chrysomelidae. It is found in Vietnam.

== Life history ==
No host plant has been documented for this species.
