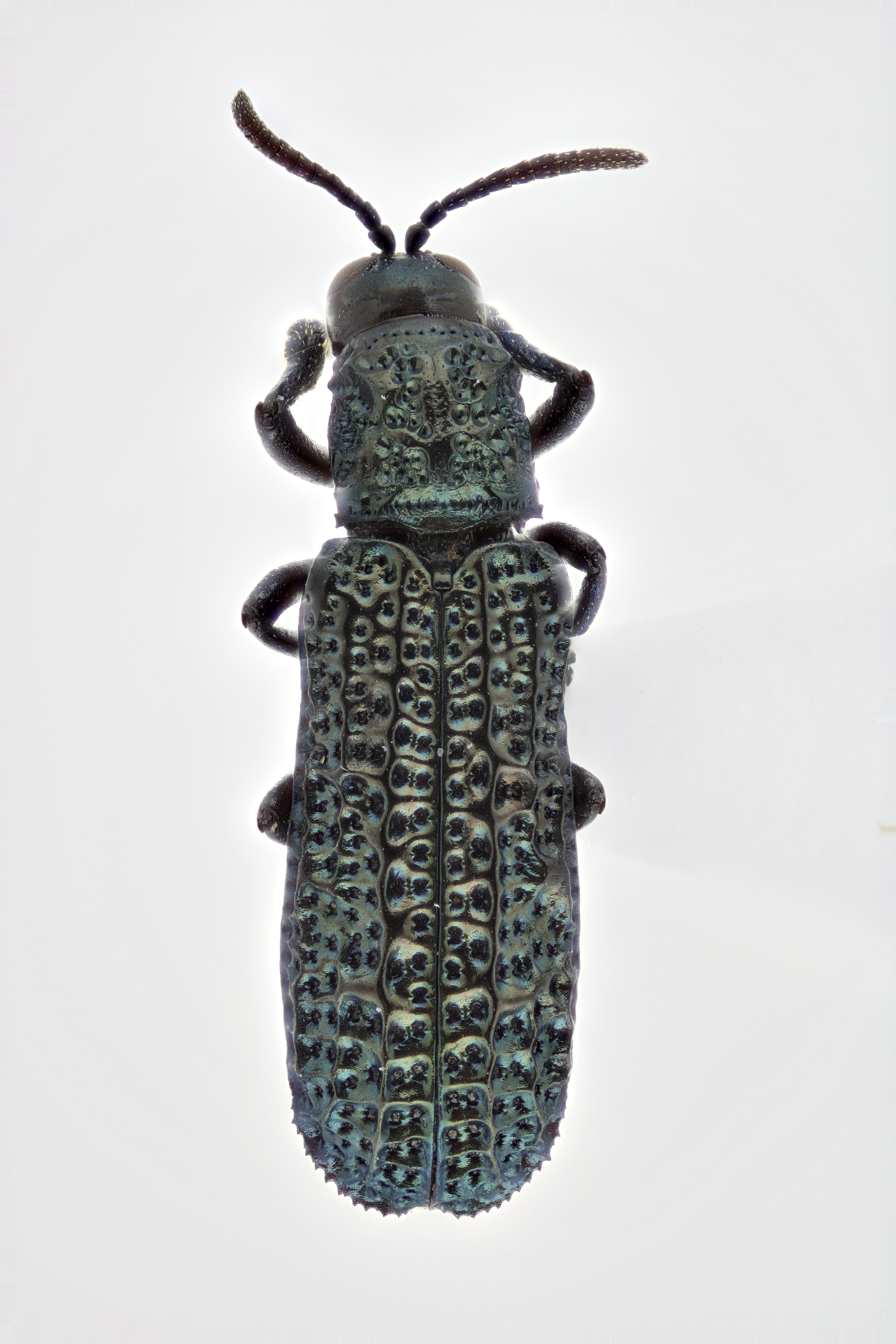

Scientific classification
- Kingdom: Animalia
- Phylum: Arthropoda
- Clade: Pancrustacea
- Class: Insecta
- Order: Coleoptera
- Suborder: Polyphaga
- Infraorder: Cucujiformia
- Family: Chrysomelidae
- Genus: Agonita
- Species: A. fossulata

Binomial name
- Agonita fossulata (Guérin-Méneville, 1844)

Synonyms
- Odontota fossulata Guérin-Méneville, 1844; Distolaca crenatipennis Kraatz, 1895

= Agonita fossulata =

Species of beetle

Agonita fossulata is a species of beetle of the family Chrysomelidae. It is found in Angola, Congo, Ivory Coast, Niger, Nigeria, Zimbabwe, Senegal, South Africa, Togo and Uganda.

== Life history ==
The recorded host plant for this species Combretum binderianum, Andropogon, Isoberlinia, Cissus, Lophira, Loudetia, Stereospermum and Kunthia species.
