= Agonita thailandica =

Scientific classification
- Kingdom: Animalia
- Phylum: Arthropoda
- Class: Insecta
- Order: Coleoptera
- Suborder: Polyphaga
- Infraorder: Cucujiformia
- Family: Chrysomelidae
- Genus: Agonita
- Species: A. thailandica

Binomial name
- Agonita thailandica Staines, 2010

Synonyms
- Agonita apicata L. N. Medvedev, 2001 (preocc.)

Species of beetle

Agonita thailandica is a species of beetle of the family Chrysomelidae. It is found in Thailand.

== Life history ==
No host plant has been documented for this species.
