= Agonita spaethi =

Scientific classification
- Kingdom: Animalia
- Phylum: Arthropoda
- Class: Insecta
- Order: Coleoptera
- Suborder: Polyphaga
- Infraorder: Cucujiformia
- Family: Chrysomelidae
- Genus: Agonita
- Species: A. spaethi

Binomial name
- Agonita spaethi (Uhmann, 1928)

Synonyms
- Agonia spaethi Uhmann, 1928

Species of beetle

Agonita spaethi is a species of beetle of the family Chrysomelidae. It is found in Indonesia (Sumatra).

== Life history ==
No host plant has been documented for this species.
