= Agonita unicolor =

Scientific classification
- Kingdom: Animalia
- Phylum: Arthropoda
- Class: Insecta
- Order: Coleoptera
- Suborder: Polyphaga
- Infraorder: Cucujiformia
- Family: Chrysomelidae
- Genus: Agonita
- Species: A. unicolor

Binomial name
- Agonita unicolor (Chûjô, 1933)

Synonyms
- Agonia unicolor Chûjô, 1933

Species of beetle

Agonita unicolor is a species of beetle of the family Chrysomelidae. It is found in Taiwan.

== Description ==
Adults reach a length of about 4-5.8 mm. They are blackish-brown or black.

== Life history ==
The recorded host plants for this species are Miscanthus species, Arundinaria usawai and Yushania niitakayamensis.
