= Agonita omoro =

Scientific classification
- Kingdom: Animalia
- Phylum: Arthropoda
- Class: Insecta
- Order: Coleoptera
- Suborder: Polyphaga
- Infraorder: Cucujiformia
- Family: Chrysomelidae
- Genus: Agonita
- Species: A. omoro

Binomial name
- Agonita omoro Takizawa, 1975

Species of beetle

Agonita omoro is a species of beetle of the family Chrysomelidae. It is found in Taiwan and Japan (Ryukyu Islands).

== Description ==
Adults reach a length of about 4.6–5.2 mm. They have a blackish-brown or dark brown head, while the antennae are dark brown. The pronotum is dark brown with a darker lateral margin. The elytra are pale yellow.

== Life history ==
The recorded host plant for this species is Carex cryptostachys.
