= Agonita pallipes =

Scientific classification
- Kingdom: Animalia
- Phylum: Arthropoda
- Clade: Pancrustacea
- Class: Insecta
- Order: Coleoptera
- Suborder: Polyphaga
- Infraorder: Cucujiformia
- Family: Chrysomelidae
- Genus: Agonita
- Species: A. pallipes

Binomial name
- Agonita pallipes (Spaeth, 1933)

Synonyms
- Agonia pallipes Spaeth, 1933; Agonia pallipes clara Uhmann, 1935

Species of beetle

Agonita pallipes is a species of beetle of the family Chrysomelidae. It is found in Indonesia (Java).

== Life history ==
The recorded host plants for this species are Bambusa species.
