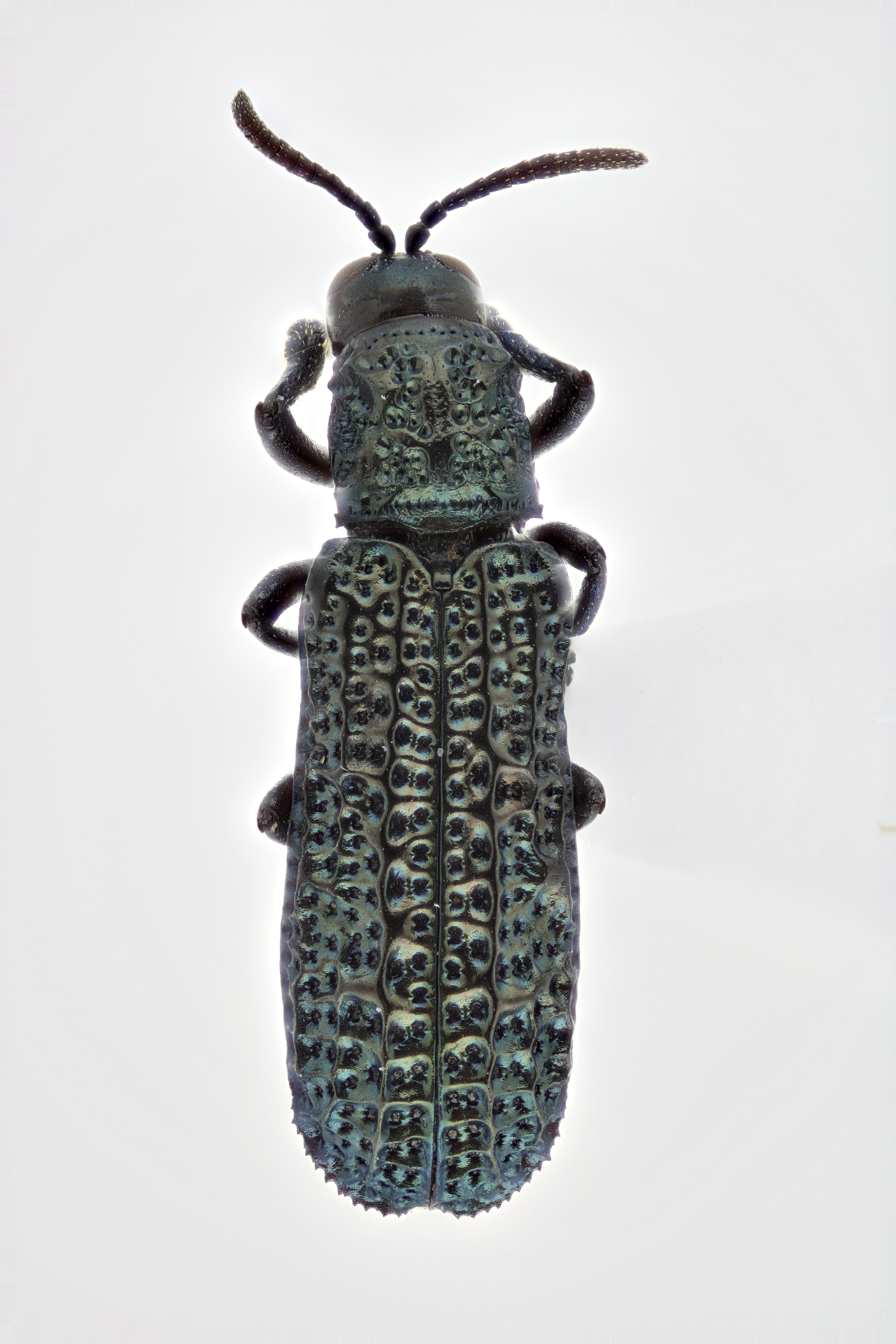
- Agonita fossulata

Scientific classification
- Kingdom: Animalia
- Phylum: Arthropoda
- Class: Insecta
- Order: Coleoptera
- Suborder: Polyphaga
- Infraorder: Cucujiformia
- Family: Chrysomelidae
- Subfamily: Cassidinae
- Tribe: Gonophorini
- Genus: Agonita; Strand, 1942

Synonyms
- Agonia Weise, 1905 (preocc.); Gonophora (Lachnispa) Gestro, 1897; Gonophora (Sinagonia) Chen et al., 1962

= Agonita =

Genus of leaf beetles

Agonita is a genus of beetles belonging to the family Chrysomelidae. Species have been recorded from Africa and Asia.

== Species ==
- Agonita amoena (Péringuey, 1908)
- Agonita andrewesi (Weise, 1897)
- Agonita andrewesimima (Maulik, 1919)
- Agonita angulata (Chen and Tan in Chen, Tan, Yu and Sun, 1962)
- Agonita apicata Chen and Sun in Chen, Sun and Yu, 1964
- Agonita apicipennis (Baly, 1869)
- Agonita attenuata (Gestro, 1917)
- Agonita bakeri (Uhmann, 1931)
- Agonita bangalana (Duvivier, 1890)
- Agonita bicolor (Gestro, 1897)
- Agonita brittoni Uhmann, 1954
- Agonita carbunculus (Maulik, 1919)
- Agonita castanea (Tan and Sun in Chen, Tan, Yu and Sun, 1962)
- Agonita cherapunjiensis (Maulik, 1916)
- Agonita chinensis (Weise, 1922)
- Agonita chlorina (Maulik, 1928)
- Agonita clavareaui (Gestro, 1899)
- Agonita coomani (Pic, 1924)
- Agonita cribricollis (Gestro, 1900)
- Agonita dangali Medvedev, 2009
- Agonita darjeelingensis Basu, 1999
- Agonita decemmaculata (Kraatz, 1900)
- Agonita decorata (Gestro, 1897)
- Agonita discrepans Uhmann, 1954
- Agonita drescheri Uhmann, 1960
- Agonita dulitana (Uhmann, 1938)
- Agonita fallax (Gestro, 1911)
- Agonita femoralis (Weise, 1905)
- Agonita fossulata (Guérin-Méneville, 1844)
- Agonita foveicollis (Chen and Tan in Chen, Tan, Yu and Sun, 1962)
- Agonita fuscipes (Baly, 1858)
- Agonita himalayensis (Maulik, 1919)
- Agonita immaculata (Gestro, 1888)
- Agonita incerta (Gestro, 1896)
- Agonita indenticulata (Pic, 1924)
- Agonita insignis (Baly, 1858)
- Agonita insularis (Gestro, 1896)
- Agonita interrupta (Duvivier, 1891)
- Agonita jacobsoni (Uhmann, 1928)
- Agonita javanica (Gestro, 1900)
- Agonita kerintjica (Uhmann, 1928)
- Agonita klapperichi Uhmann, 1954
- Agonita kunminensis (Tan and Sun in Chen, Tan, Yu and Sun, 1962)
- Agonita kuntzeni (Uhmann, 1932)
- Agonita laeta Medvedev and Sprecher-Uebersax, 1999
- Agonita laevicollis (Gestro, 1917)
- Agonita laticeps (Gressitt, 1939)
- Agonita limbata (Pic, 1927)
- Agonita lineaticollis (Pic, 1941)
- Agonita lohita Basu, 1999
- Agonita lucida (Gestro, 1897)
- Agonita luzonica (Weise, 1922)
- Agonita macrophthalma (Gestro, 1922)
- Agonita maculigera (Gestro, 1888)
- Agonita malangensis (Weise, 1922)
- Agonita mauliki (Gestro, 1920)
- Agonita metasternalis (Tan and Sun in Chen, Tan, Yu and Sun, 1962)
- Agonita methneri (Uhmann, 1928)
- Agonita mira (Gestro, 1917)
- Agonita modiglianii (Gestro, 1892)
- Agonita nana (Gestro, 1917)
- Agonita nanpinensis Chen and Sun in Chen, Sun and Yu, 1964
- Agonita nepalica Medvedev, 2003
- Agonita nigra (Tan and Sun in Chen, Tan, Yu and Sun, 1962)
- Agonita nigriceps (Baly, 1869)
- Agonita nigricornis (Gestro, 1911)
- Agonita nigrovittata (Gestro, 1897)
- Agonita nilava (Maulik, 1919)
- Agonita nitida (Gestro, 1906)
- Agonita omeia Chen and Sun in Chen, Sun and Yu, 1964
- Agonita omoro Takizawa, 1975
- Agonita pallidipennis (Maulik, 1919)
- Agonita pallipes (Spaeth, 1933)
- Agonita parallela Uhmann, 1961
- Agonita parvula (Gestro, 1890)
- Agonita picea Gressitt, 1953
- Agonita pictipes Chen and Sun in Chen, Sun and Yu, 1964
- Agonita pilipes (Chen and Sun in Chen, Tan, Yu and Sun, 1962)
- Agonita pitava Basu, 1999
- Agonita purpurascens (Gressitt, 1939)
- Agonita quadripunctata (Guérin-Méneville in Cuvier, 1844)
- Agonita regularis Uhmann, 1967
- Agonita ruficollis Chen and Sun in Chen, Sun and Yu, 1964
- Agonita saundersi (Baly, 1858)
- Agonita sculpturata (Gressitt, 1953)
- Agonita semibrunnea (Pic, 1940)
- Agonita seminigra (Tan and Sun in Chen, Tan, Yu and Sun, 1962)
- Agonita shailaja (Maulik, 1919)
- Agonita shelfordi (Gestro, 1903)
- Agonita spaethi (Uhmann, 1928)
- Agonita spathoglottis (Uhmann, 1929)
- Agonita suturella (Baly, 1858)
- Agonita suturellamima (Maulik, 1919)
- Agonita tabangae Uhmann, 1960
- Agonita tavoya (Maulik, 1919)
- Agonita tayabasensis (Uhmann, 1931)
- Agonita testaceicornis (Pic, 1942)
- Agonita thailandica Staines, 2010
- Agonita tricolor (Chûjô, 1933)
- Agonita tricostata Yu and Huang, 2002
- Agonita tristicula (Weise, 1922)
- Agonita tristis (Chen and Sun in Chen, Tan, Yu and Sun, 1962)
- Agonita umtalica (Uhmann, 1930)
- Agonita undata (Uhmann, 1929)
- Agonita unicolor (Chûjô, 1933)
- Agonita variegata (Gestro, 1907)
- Agonita vicina (Uhmann, 1935)
- Agonita wallacei (Baly, 1858)
- Agonita weberi (Weise, 1911)
- Agonita xanthosticta (Gestro, 1897)
