= Agonita indenticulata =

Scientific classification
- Kingdom: Animalia
- Phylum: Arthropoda
- Class: Insecta
- Order: Coleoptera
- Suborder: Polyphaga
- Infraorder: Cucujiformia
- Family: Chrysomelidae
- Genus: Agonita
- Species: A. indenticulata

Binomial name
- Agonita indenticulata (Pic, 1924)

Synonyms
- Agonia indenticulata Pic, 1924

Species of beetle

Agonita indenticulata is a species of beetle of the family Chrysomelidae. It is found in China (Yunnan), Laos and Vietnam.

== Life history ==
No host plant has been documented for this species.
