= Agonita picea =

Scientific classification
- Kingdom: Animalia
- Phylum: Arthropoda
- Class: Insecta
- Order: Coleoptera
- Suborder: Polyphaga
- Infraorder: Cucujiformia
- Family: Chrysomelidae
- Genus: Agonita
- Species: A. picea

Binomial name
- Agonita picea Gressitt, 1953

Species of beetle

Agonita picea is a species of beetle of the family Chrysomelidae. It is found in China (Fujian, Guangxi, Hunan, Zhejiang).

== Life history ==
The recorded host plant for this species is Phyllostachys pubescens.
