= Agonita methneri =

Scientific classification
- Kingdom: Animalia
- Phylum: Arthropoda
- Class: Insecta
- Order: Coleoptera
- Suborder: Polyphaga
- Infraorder: Cucujiformia
- Family: Chrysomelidae
- Genus: Agonita
- Species: A. methneri

Binomial name
- Agonita methneri (Uhmann, 1928)

Synonyms
- Agonia methneri Uhmann, 1928

Species of beetle

Agonita methneri is a species of beetle of the family Chrysomelidae. It is found in Angola, Congo and South Africa.

== Life history ==
No host plant has been documented for this species.
