= Agonita xanthosticta =

Scientific classification
- Kingdom: Animalia
- Phylum: Arthropoda
- Clade: Pancrustacea
- Class: Insecta
- Order: Coleoptera
- Suborder: Polyphaga
- Infraorder: Cucujiformia
- Family: Chrysomelidae
- Genus: Agonita
- Species: A. xanthosticta

Binomial name
- Agonita xanthosticta (Gestro, 1897)

Synonyms
- Distolaca xanthosticta Gestro, 1897

Species of beetle

Agonita xanthosticta is a species of beetle of the family Chrysomelidae. It is found in Indonesia (Borneo, Sumatra) and Malaysia (Sarawak).

== Life history ==
No host plant has been documented for this species.
