= Agonita insignis =

Scientific classification
- Kingdom: Animalia
- Phylum: Arthropoda
- Clade: Pancrustacea
- Class: Insecta
- Order: Coleoptera
- Suborder: Polyphaga
- Infraorder: Cucujiformia
- Family: Chrysomelidae
- Genus: Agonita
- Species: A. insignis

Binomial name
- Agonita insignis (Baly, 1858)

Synonyms
- Gonophora insignis Baly, 1858

Species of beetle

Agonita insignis is a species of beetle of the family Chrysomelidae. It is found in Indonesia (Sulawesi).

== Description ==
Adults are broadly elongate, subdepressed and pale fulvous. The antennae (their base excepted) and a large common patch on the elytra are black. The head is smooth and the antennae are rather more than half the length of the body. The thorax is as broad at the base as long, narrowed from the base to the apex, the sides obsoletely bisinuate, notched at their extreme apex, the base narrowly margined above, narrowly cylindrical in front. The disc is convex, smooth and shining, impunctate, the sides and base coarsely and deeply punctured, the base transversely grooved. The scutellum is smooth and impunctate. The elytra are narrowly oblong, the sides margined, subparallel, the margin slightly dilated, the apex rounded and above flattened along the suture, convex on the sides. Each elytron has three elevated costae, their interspaces deeply impressed with a double row of punctures, interstices transversely costulate, pale fulvous, a large common patch extending from the termination of the anterior third nearly to the apex, black.

== Life history ==
No host plant has been documented for this species.
