= Agonita amoena =

Scientific classification
- Kingdom: Animalia
- Phylum: Arthropoda
- Class: Insecta
- Order: Coleoptera
- Suborder: Polyphaga
- Infraorder: Cucujiformia
- Family: Chrysomelidae
- Genus: Agonita
- Species: A. amoena

Binomial name
- Agonita amoena (Péringuey, 1908)

Synonyms
- Distolaca amoena Péringuey, 1908

Species of beetle

Agonita amoena is a species of beetle of the family Chrysomelidae. It is found in South Africa and Zimbabwe.

== Description ==
Adults reach a length of about 5–6 mm. They are cyan, shiny, glabrous, with darker antennae and feet. The head is scarcely punctate. The prothorax is almost parallel, but at the base somewhat wider, twice as long in width, flattened above, crudely punctate, longitudinally a slight median wrinkle, the other shorter, less distinct on both sides, situated in the middle of the disc.

== Life history ==
No host plant has been documented for this species.
