= Agonita dulitana =

Scientific classification
- Kingdom: Animalia
- Phylum: Arthropoda
- Class: Insecta
- Order: Coleoptera
- Suborder: Polyphaga
- Infraorder: Cucujiformia
- Family: Chrysomelidae
- Genus: Agonita
- Species: A. dulitana

Binomial name
- Agonita dulitana (Uhmann, 1938)

Synonyms
- Agonia dulitana Uhmann, 1938

Species of beetle

Agonita dulitana is a species of beetle of the family Chrysomelidae. It is found in Malaysia.

== Life history ==
No host plant has been documented for this species.
