= Agonita maculigera =

Scientific classification
- Kingdom: Animalia
- Phylum: Arthropoda
- Class: Insecta
- Order: Coleoptera
- Suborder: Polyphaga
- Infraorder: Cucujiformia
- Family: Chrysomelidae
- Genus: Agonita
- Species: A. maculigera

Binomial name
- Agonita maculigera (Gestro, 1888)

Synonyms
- Gonophora maculigera Gestro, 1888; Agonia multimaculata Pic, 1924

Species of beetle

Agonita maculigera is a species of beetle of the family Chrysomelidae. It is found in Cambodia, China (Fukien, Hainan, Yunnan), India (Assam), Laos, Myanmar, Nepal, Thailand and Vietnam.

== Life history ==
No host plant has been documented for this species.
