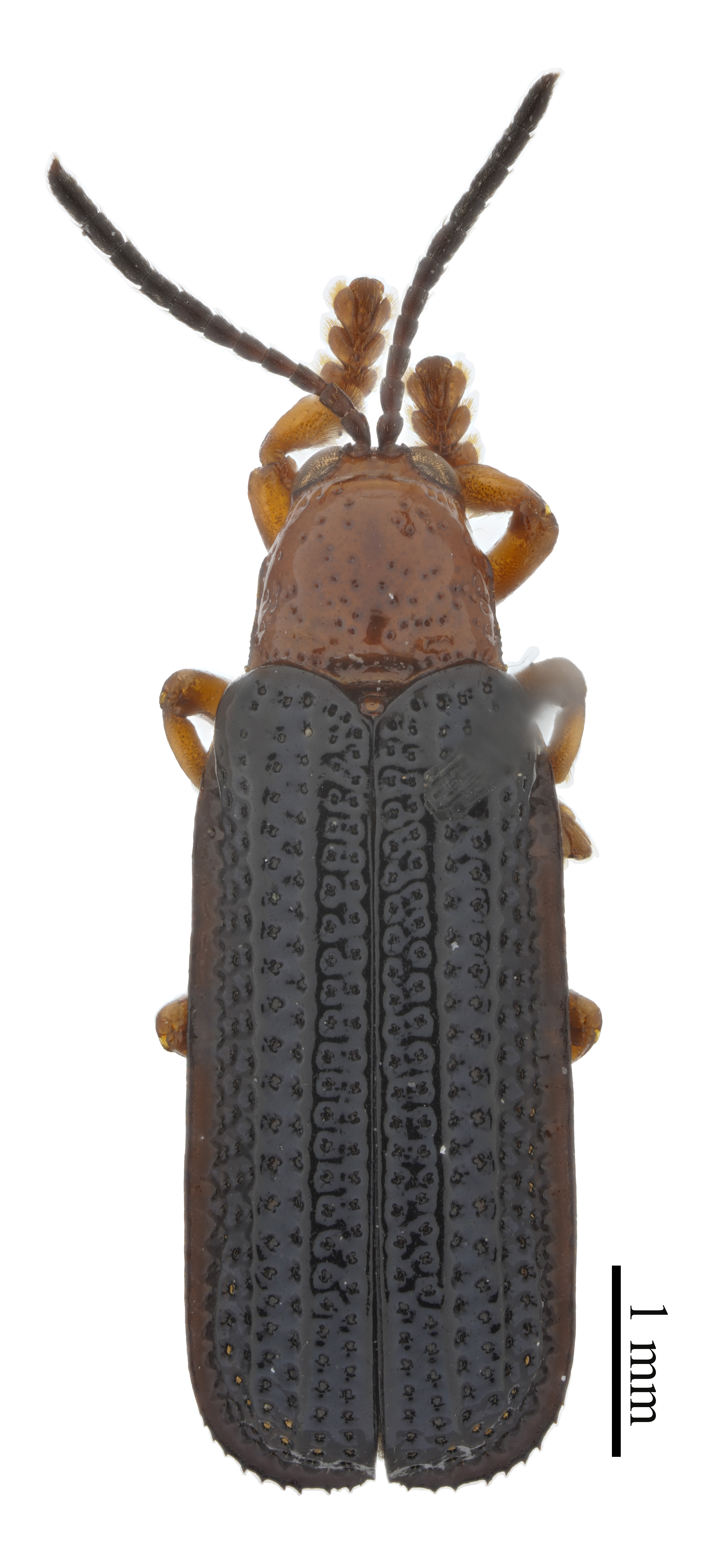
- Agonita chinensis

Scientific classification
- Kingdom: Animalia
- Phylum: Arthropoda
- Clade: Pancrustacea
- Class: Insecta
- Order: Coleoptera
- Suborder: Polyphaga
- Infraorder: Cucujiformia
- Family: Chrysomelidae
- Genus: Agonita
- Species: A. chinensis

Binomial name
- Agonita chinensis (Weise, 1922)

Synonyms
- Agonia chinensis Weise, 1922; Agonia atripennis Pic, 1926

= Agonita chinensis =

Species of beetle

Agonita atripennis is a species of beetle of the family Chrysomelidae. It is found in China (Fukien, Hainan, Guizhou, Guangdong, Yunnan) and Vietnam.

== Life history ==
No host plant has been documented for this species.
