= Agonita coomani =

Scientific classification
- Kingdom: Animalia
- Phylum: Arthropoda
- Class: Insecta
- Order: Coleoptera
- Suborder: Polyphaga
- Infraorder: Cucujiformia
- Family: Chrysomelidae
- Genus: Agonita
- Species: A. coomani

Binomial name
- Agonita coomani (Pic, 1924)

Synonyms
- Agonia coomani Pic, 1924

Species of beetle

Agonita coomani is a species of beetle of the family Chrysomelidae. It is found in Laos and Vietnam.

== Life history ==
No host plant has been documented for this species.
