= Agonita tristicula =

Scientific classification
- Kingdom: Animalia
- Phylum: Arthropoda
- Class: Insecta
- Order: Coleoptera
- Suborder: Polyphaga
- Infraorder: Cucujiformia
- Family: Chrysomelidae
- Genus: Agonita
- Species: A. tristicula

Binomial name
- Agonita tristicula (Weise, 1922)

Synonyms
- Agonia tristicula Weise, 1922

Species of beetle

Agonita tristicula is a species of beetle of the family Chrysomelidae. It is found in Malaysia.

== Life history ==
No host plant has been documented for this species.
