= Agonita discrepans =

Scientific classification
- Kingdom: Animalia
- Phylum: Arthropoda
- Class: Insecta
- Order: Coleoptera
- Suborder: Polyphaga
- Infraorder: Cucujiformia
- Family: Chrysomelidae
- Genus: Agonita
- Species: A. discrepans

Binomial name
- Agonita discrepans Uhmann, 1954

Species of beetle

Agonita discrepans is a species of beetle of the family Chrysomelidae. It is found in China (Fujian, Hainan).

== Life history ==
No host plant has been documented for this species.
