= Agonita kuntzeni =

Scientific classification
- Kingdom: Animalia
- Phylum: Arthropoda
- Class: Insecta
- Order: Coleoptera
- Suborder: Polyphaga
- Infraorder: Cucujiformia
- Family: Chrysomelidae
- Genus: Agonita
- Species: A. kuntzeni

Binomial name
- Agonita kuntzeni (Uhmann, 1932)

Synonyms
- Agonia kuntzeni Uhmann, 1932

Species of beetle

Agonita kuntzeni is a species of beetle of the family Chrysomelidae. It is found in Cameroon, Congo and Sudan.

== Life history ==
The recorded host plants for this species are Bridelia micrantha, Urena lobata, Lophira alata, Loudetia, Hyparrhenia, Panicum, Sporobolus, Jussiaea, Maranthochloa, Impatiens, Aeschynomene, Cissus and Thalia species.
