= Agonita sculpturata =

Scientific classification
- Kingdom: Animalia
- Phylum: Arthropoda
- Class: Insecta
- Order: Coleoptera
- Suborder: Polyphaga
- Infraorder: Cucujiformia
- Family: Chrysomelidae
- Genus: Agonita
- Species: A. sculpturata

Binomial name
- Agonita sculpturata Gressitt, 1953

Species of beetle

Agonita sculpturata is a species of beetle of the family Chrysomelidae. It is found in China (Fukien, Sichuan, Yunnan) and Vietnam.

== Life history ==
No host plant has been documented for this species.
