= Agonita nitida =

Scientific classification
- Kingdom: Animalia
- Phylum: Arthropoda
- Clade: Pancrustacea
- Class: Insecta
- Order: Coleoptera
- Suborder: Polyphaga
- Infraorder: Cucujiformia
- Family: Chrysomelidae
- Genus: Agonita
- Species: A. nitida

Binomial name
- Agonita nitida (Gestro, 1906)

Synonyms
- Distolaca nitida Gestro, 1906

Species of beetle

Agonita nitida is a species of beetle of the family Chrysomelidae. It is found in Indonesia (Java, Sumatra).

== Life history ==
No host plant has been documented for this species.
