= Agonita nepalica =

Scientific classification
- Kingdom: Animalia
- Phylum: Arthropoda
- Class: Insecta
- Order: Coleoptera
- Suborder: Polyphaga
- Infraorder: Cucujiformia
- Family: Chrysomelidae
- Genus: Agonita
- Species: A. nepalica

Binomial name
- Agonita nepalica Medvedev, 2003

Species of beetle

Agonita nepalica is a species of beetle of the family Chrysomelidae. It is found in Nepal.

== Life history ==
No host plant has been documented for this species.
