= Agonita kerintjica =

Scientific classification
- Kingdom: Animalia
- Phylum: Arthropoda
- Class: Insecta
- Order: Coleoptera
- Suborder: Polyphaga
- Infraorder: Cucujiformia
- Family: Chrysomelidae
- Genus: Agonita
- Species: A. kerintjica

Binomial name
- Agonita kerintjica (Uhmann, 1928)

Synonyms
- Agonia kerintjica Uhmann, 1928

Species of beetle

Agonita kerintjica is a species of beetle of the family Chrysomelidae. It is found in Indonesia (Sumatra).

== Life history ==
No host plant has been documented for this species.
