= Agonita undata =

Scientific classification
- Kingdom: Animalia
- Phylum: Arthropoda
- Clade: Pancrustacea
- Class: Insecta
- Order: Coleoptera
- Suborder: Polyphaga
- Infraorder: Cucujiformia
- Family: Chrysomelidae
- Genus: Agonita
- Species: A. undata

Binomial name
- Agonita undata (Uhmann, 1929)

Synonyms
- Agonia spathoglottis undata Uhmann, 1929

Species of beetle

Agonita undata is a species of beetle of the family Chrysomelidae. It is found in Indonesia (Java, Sumatra).

== Life history ==
The recorded host plants for this species are Arundina species, but it possibly also feeds on other orchids.
