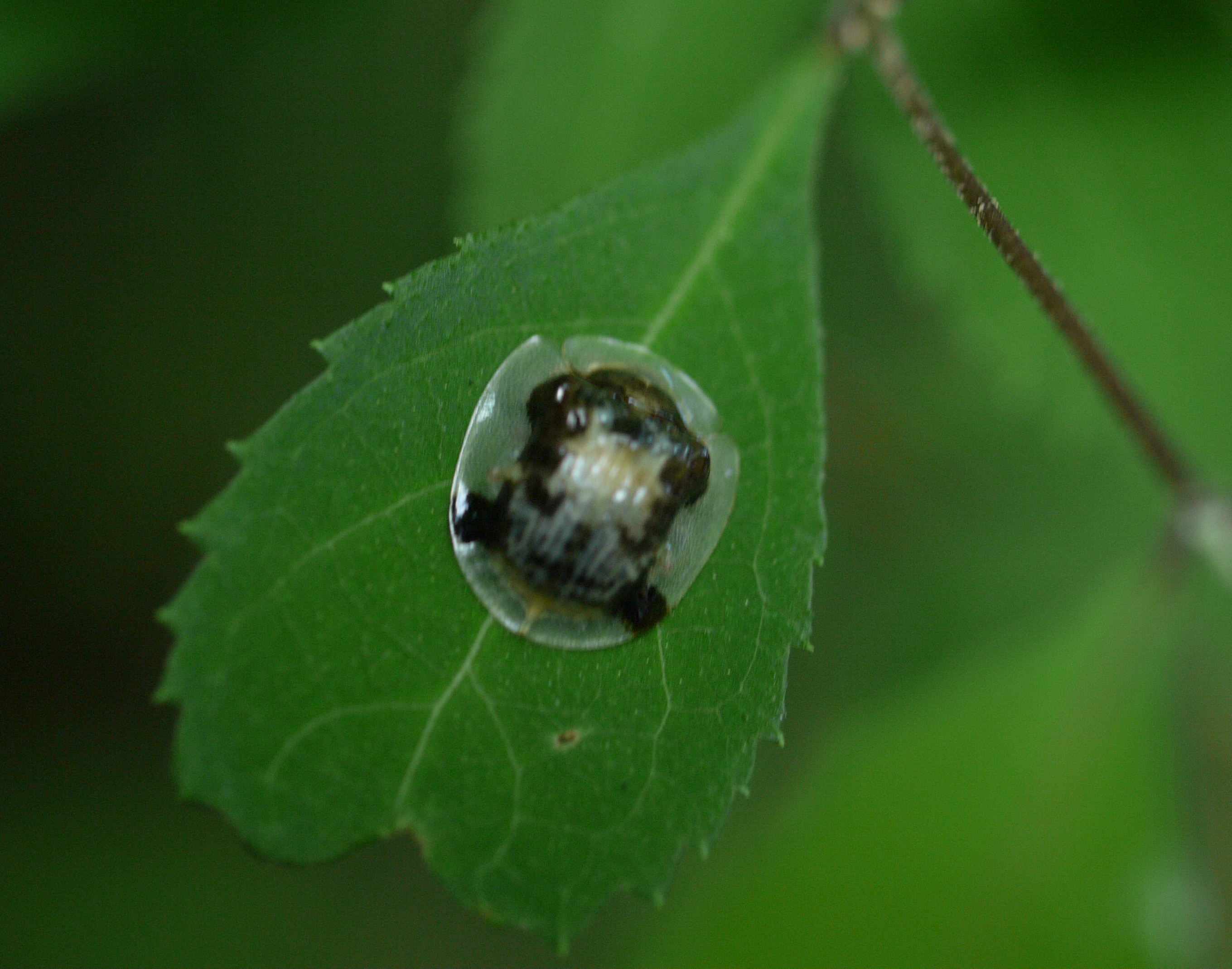

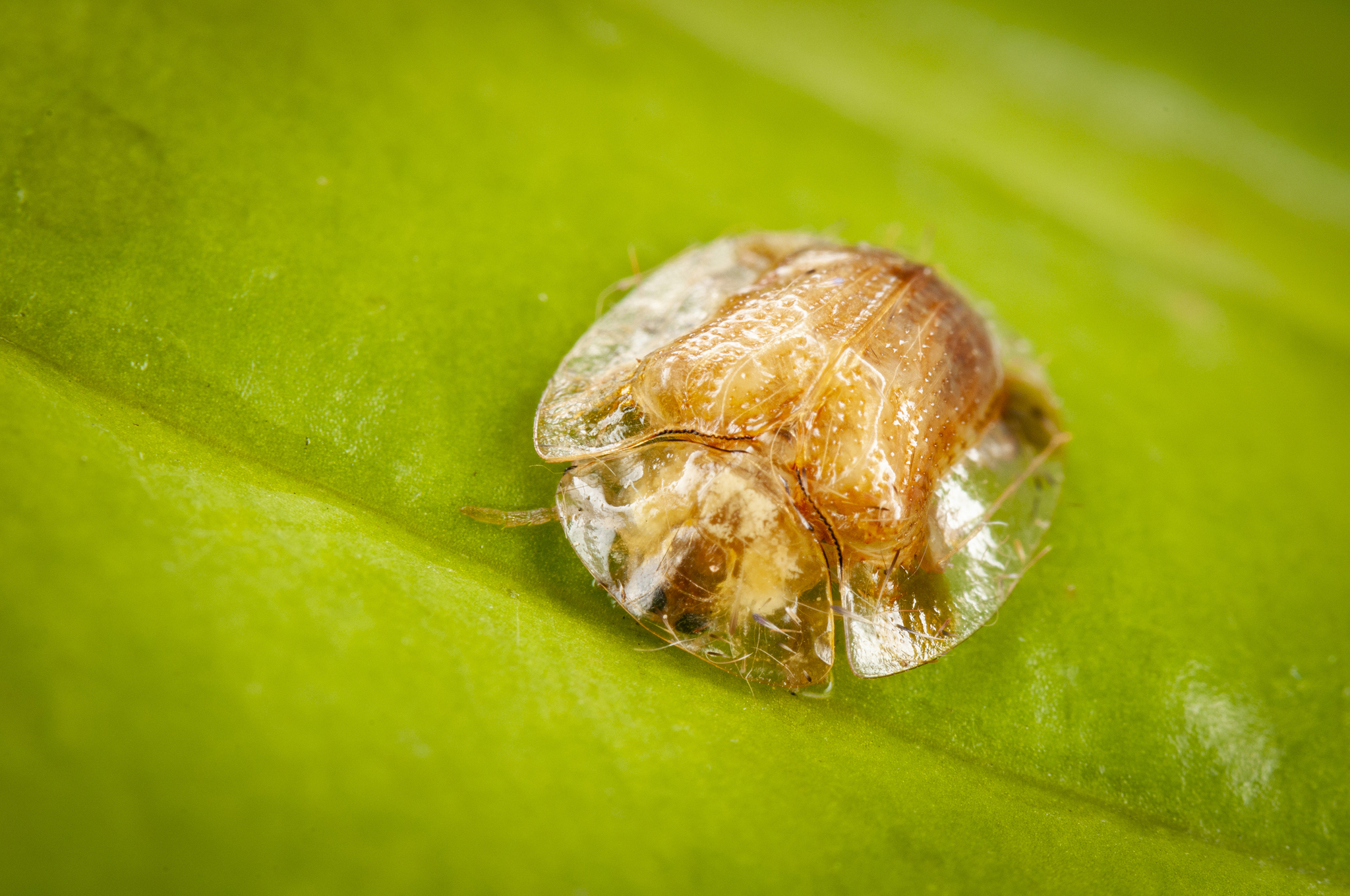
- Thlaspida lewisii, Adult, South Korea

Scientific classification
- Kingdom: Animalia
- Phylum: Arthropoda
- Clade: Pancrustacea
- Class: Insecta
- Order: Coleoptera
- Suborder: Polyphaga
- Infraorder: Cucujiformia
- Family: Chrysomelidae
- Subfamily: Cassidinae
- Genus: Thlaspida; Weise, 1899

= Thlaspida =

Genus of beetles

Thlaspida is a genus of tortoise beetles in the family Chrysomelidae.

== Selected species ==
- Thlaspida biramosa (Boheman, 1855)
- Thlaspida cribrosa Boheman, 1855
- Thlaspida lewisii Baly, 1874
