= Agonita jacobsoni =

Scientific classification
- Kingdom: Animalia
- Phylum: Arthropoda
- Clade: Pancrustacea
- Class: Insecta
- Order: Coleoptera
- Suborder: Polyphaga
- Infraorder: Cucujiformia
- Family: Chrysomelidae
- Genus: Agonita
- Species: A. jacobsoni

Binomial name
- Agonita jacobsoni (Uhmann, 1928)

Synonyms
- Agonia jacobsoni Uhmann, 1928

Species of beetle

Agonita jacobsoni is a species of beetle of the family Chrysomelidae. It is found in Indonesia (Java, Sumatra).

== Life history ==
No host plant has been documented for this species.
