= Agonita decemmaculata =

Scientific classification
- Kingdom: Animalia
- Phylum: Arthropoda
- Class: Insecta
- Order: Coleoptera
- Suborder: Polyphaga
- Infraorder: Cucujiformia
- Family: Chrysomelidae
- Genus: Agonita
- Species: A. decemmaculata

Binomial name
- Agonita decemmaculata (Kraatz, 1900)

Synonyms
- Distolaca decemmaculata Kraatz, 1900

Species of beetle

Agonita decemmaculata is a species of beetle of the family Chrysomelidae. It is found in Cameroon, Guinea and Togo.

== Life history ==
No host plant has been documented for this species.
