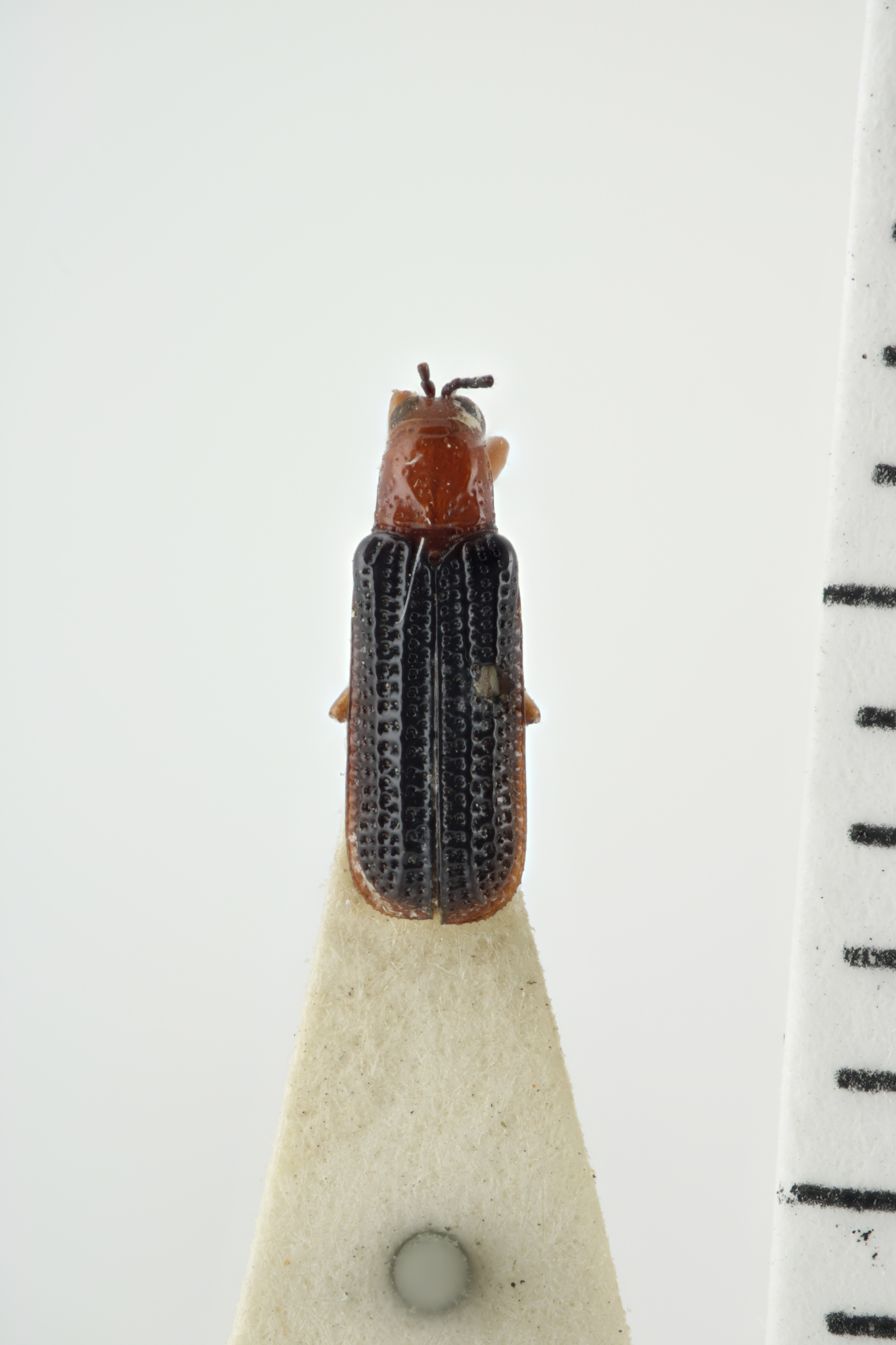

Scientific classification
- Kingdom: Animalia
- Phylum: Arthropoda
- Class: Insecta
- Order: Coleoptera
- Suborder: Polyphaga
- Infraorder: Cucujiformia
- Family: Chrysomelidae
- Genus: Agonita
- Species: A. andrewesi

Binomial name
- Agonita andrewesi (Weise, 1897)

Synonyms
- Gonophora andrewesi Weise, 1897; Gonophora andrewesi bicolor Weise, 1897; Agonita andrewesi mutata Uhmann, 1958

= Agonita andrewesi =

Species of beetle

Agonita andrewesi is a species of beetle of the family Chrysomelidae. It is found in India.

== Life history ==
No host plant has been documented for this species.
