= Agonita spathoglottis =

Scientific classification
- Kingdom: Animalia
- Phylum: Arthropoda
- Clade: Pancrustacea
- Class: Insecta
- Order: Coleoptera
- Suborder: Polyphaga
- Infraorder: Cucujiformia
- Family: Chrysomelidae
- Genus: Agonita
- Species: A. spathoglottis

Binomial name
- Agonita spathoglottis (Uhmann, 1929)

Synonyms
- Agonia spathoglottis Uhmann, 1929

Species of beetle

Agonita spathoglottis is a species of beetle of the family Chrysomelidae. It is found in Indonesia (Java, Sumatra, Sunda Islands) and Malaysia.

== Life history ==
The recorded host plant for this species are Phalaenopsis amabilis, Vanda coerulea, Vanda tricolor, Arundina and Spathoglottis species.
