= Agonita cribricollis =

Scientific classification
- Kingdom: Animalia
- Phylum: Arthropoda
- Class: Insecta
- Order: Coleoptera
- Suborder: Polyphaga
- Infraorder: Cucujiformia
- Family: Chrysomelidae
- Genus: Agonita
- Species: A. cribricollis

Binomial name
- Agonita cribricollis (Gestro, 1900)

Synonyms
- Distolaca cribricollis Gestro, 1900

Species of beetle

Agonita cribricollis is a species of beetle of the family Chrysomelidae. It is found in India.

== Life history ==
No host plant has been documented for this species.
