= Agonita immaculata =

Scientific classification
- Kingdom: Animalia
- Phylum: Arthropoda
- Class: Insecta
- Order: Coleoptera
- Suborder: Polyphaga
- Infraorder: Cucujiformia
- Family: Chrysomelidae
- Genus: Agonita
- Species: A. immaculata

Binomial name
- Agonita immaculata (Gestro, 1888)

Synonyms
- Gonophora immaculata Gestro, 1888; Agonia nigrimembris Pic, 1926

Species of beetle

Agonita immaculata is a species of beetle of the family Chrysomelidae. It is found in Bangladesh, China (Yunnan), India, Myanmar and Vietnam.

== Life history ==
No host plant has been documented for this species.
