= Agonita tayabasensis =

Scientific classification
- Kingdom: Animalia
- Phylum: Arthropoda
- Class: Insecta
- Order: Coleoptera
- Suborder: Polyphaga
- Infraorder: Cucujiformia
- Family: Chrysomelidae
- Genus: Agonita
- Species: A. tayabasensis

Binomial name
- Agonita tayabasensis (Uhmann, 1931)

Synonyms
- Agonia tayabasenis Uhmann, 1931

Species of beetle

Agonita tayabasensis is a species of beetle of the family Chrysomelidae. It is found in the Philippines (Luzon).

== Life history ==
The recorded host plant for this species is Phalaenopsis amabilis.
