= Agonita bakeri =

Scientific classification
- Kingdom: Animalia
- Phylum: Arthropoda
- Class: Insecta
- Order: Coleoptera
- Suborder: Polyphaga
- Infraorder: Cucujiformia
- Family: Chrysomelidae
- Genus: Agonita
- Species: A. bakeri

Binomial name
- Agonita bakeri (Uhmann, 1931)

Synonyms
- Agonia bakeri Uhmann, 1931

Species of beetle

Agonita bakeri is a species of beetle of the family Chrysomelidae. It is found in the Philippines (Mindanao, Negros).

== Life history ==
No host plant has been documented for this species.
