= Agonita bicolor =

Scientific classification
- Kingdom: Animalia
- Phylum: Arthropoda
- Class: Insecta
- Order: Coleoptera
- Suborder: Polyphaga
- Infraorder: Cucujiformia
- Family: Chrysomelidae
- Genus: Agonita
- Species: A. bicolor

Binomial name
- Agonita bicolor (Gestro, 1897)

Synonyms
- Gonophora (Lachnispa) bicolor Gestro, 1897

Species of beetle

Agonita bicolor is a species of beetle of the family Chrysomelidae. It is found in Indonesia (Sumatra).

== Life history ==
The recorded host plants for this species are Metroxylon species.
