= Agonita modiglianii =

Scientific classification
- Kingdom: Animalia
- Phylum: Arthropoda
- Clade: Pancrustacea
- Class: Insecta
- Order: Coleoptera
- Suborder: Polyphaga
- Infraorder: Cucujiformia
- Family: Chrysomelidae
- Genus: Agonita
- Species: A. modiglianii

Binomial name
- Agonita modiglianii (Gestro, 1892)

Synonyms
- Gonophora modiglianii Gestro, 1892

Species of beetle

Agonita modiglianii is a species of beetle of the family Chrysomelidae. It is found in Indonesia (Borneo, Sumatra) and Malaysia.

== Life history ==
No host plant has been documented for this species.
