= Agonita clavareaui =

Scientific classification
- Kingdom: Animalia
- Phylum: Arthropoda
- Clade: Pancrustacea
- Class: Insecta
- Order: Coleoptera
- Suborder: Polyphaga
- Infraorder: Cucujiformia
- Family: Chrysomelidae
- Genus: Agonita
- Species: A. clavareaui

Binomial name
- Agonita clavareaui (Gestro, 1899)

Synonyms
- Gonophora (Distolaca) clavareaui Gestro, 1899

Species of beetle

Agonita clavareaui is a species of beetle of the family Chrysomelidae. It is found in Indonesia (Java, Sumatra) and Malaysia.

== Life history ==
No host plant has been documented for this species.
