= Agonita parvula =

Scientific classification
- Kingdom: Animalia
- Phylum: Arthropoda
- Class: Insecta
- Order: Coleoptera
- Suborder: Polyphaga
- Infraorder: Cucujiformia
- Family: Chrysomelidae
- Genus: Agonita
- Species: A. parvula

Binomial name
- Agonita parvula (Gestro, 1890)

Synonyms
- Gonophora parvula Gestro, 1890

Species of beetle

Agonita parvula is a species of beetle of the family Chrysomelidae. It is found in Bhutan, China (Fujian), Myanmar and Taiwan.

== Life history ==
The recorded host plant for this species is Smilax china.
