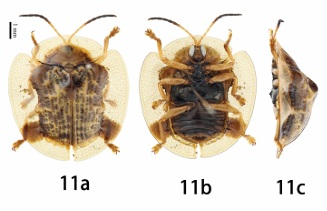

Scientific classification
- Kingdom: Animalia
- Phylum: Arthropoda
- Class: Insecta
- Order: Coleoptera
- Suborder: Polyphaga
- Infraorder: Cucujiformia
- Family: Chrysomelidae
- Genus: Thlaspida
- Species: T. biramosa

Binomial name
- Thlaspida biramosa (Boheman, 1855)

Synonyms
- Coptocycla bi-ramosa Boheman, 1855; Thlaspida tristis Weise, 1899; Thlaspida formosae Spaeth, 1913; Thlaspida japonica Spaeth, 1914a; Thlaspida chinensis Spaeth, 1926; Thlaspida formosae ab. immaculatipennis Chûjô, 1934; Thlaspida biramosa omeia Chen & Zia, 1964

= Thlaspida biramosa =

Species of beetle

Thlaspida biramosa is a species of beetle of the Chrysomelidae family. This species is found in China (Anhui, Fujian, Guangdong, Guangxi, Guizhou, Hainan, Hubei, Hunan, Jiangsu, Jiangxi, Sichuan, Yunnan, Zhejiang), Taiwan, India, Japan, Laos, Malaysia, Myanmar, North Korea, Thailand and Vietnam.

Adults have an elliptical body. The pronotum is chestnut brown and the elytral disc is strongly tumid, with coarse punctures, arranged in regular longitudinal rows.
