= Agonita saundersi =

Scientific classification
- Kingdom: Animalia
- Phylum: Arthropoda
- Class: Insecta
- Order: Coleoptera
- Suborder: Polyphaga
- Infraorder: Cucujiformia
- Family: Chrysomelidae
- Genus: Agonita
- Species: A. saundersi

Binomial name
- Agonita saundersi (Baly, 1858)

Synonyms
- Gonophora saundersi Baly, 1858

Species of beetle

Agonita saundersi is a species of beetle of the family Chrysomelidae. It is found in Bangladesh, India (Assam, West Bengal) and Nepal.

== Description ==
Adults are elongate, subdepressed and shining black. The head behind, the thorax (a longitudinal line down the middle excepted), and the elytra are red. The head is smooth, impressed above with a deep fovea. The antennae are entirely black, robust and half the length of the body. The thorax is transverse-quadrate, slightly narrowed from the base to the apex, the sides deeply bisinuate, the apical angle slightly produced laterally and acute. The apical margin is convex, but above subconvex, with three broad longitudinal elevations, indistinctly grooved above, smooth, impunctate, the two outer interrupted and nearly obsolete behind their middle, the central one entire and covered with a broad black vitta, which extends from the base to the apex of the thorax, the rest of the surface is rugose-punctate. The basal margin is transversely grooved in the middle. The scutellum is smooth and black. The elytra broader are than the thorax, with the sides parallel, narrowly margined and with the apex obtusely rounded, above subdepressed, convex on the sides. Each elytron has three strongly elevated costae, the suture also raised, interspaces with three or more confused rows of deeply impressed punctures.

== Life history ==
No host plant has been documented for this species.
