= Agonita wallacei =

Scientific classification
- Kingdom: Animalia
- Phylum: Arthropoda
- Clade: Pancrustacea
- Class: Insecta
- Order: Coleoptera
- Suborder: Polyphaga
- Infraorder: Cucujiformia
- Family: Chrysomelidae
- Genus: Agonita
- Species: A. wallacei

Binomial name
- Agonita wallacei (Baly, 1858)

Synonyms
- Gonophora wallacei Baly, 1858

Species of beetle

Agonita wallacei is a species of beetle of the family Chrysomelidae. It is found in Indonesia (Borneo, Sumatra) and Malaysia.

== Description ==
Adults are elongate, subdepressed and shining red above. The head, lateral margin of the thorax, a longitudinal stripe down its middle, and the scutellum are all black, while the head is shining black, the face with a small fulvous patch below the insertion of the antennae. The thorax is transverse-quadrate, slightly narrowed from the base to the apex, the sides nearly straight behind, slightly rounded and narrowed before the middle, their apex deeply notched, and the anterior and posterior angles acute, the latter slightly produced. The elytra are broader at their base than the thorax, the sides slightly dilated, indistinctly rounded. The apex is obtuse, above subdepressed, moderately convex on the sides, the dilated margin nearly horizontal. Each elytron has three elevated costae, the outer one less distinctly raised than the other two, and nearly obsolete in the middle.

== Life history ==
No host plant has been documented for this species.
