= Samarendra Maulik =

Indian entomologist

Samarendra Nath Maulik (25 December 1881 in Tamluk – 9 July 1950 in Chelsea) was an Indian entomologist who worked at the Natural History Museum, London and specialized in the systematics of the leaf beetles. He worked briefly at the University of Calcutta as a professor of Zoology. A structure on the hind femur, particularly of flea beetles, and used in their leaping motion has sometimes been called as "Maulik's organ".

== Life and work ==
Maulik was born in Tamluk, West Bengal. He studied physics, chemistry and mathematics at St Xavier's College, Calcutta but later became interested in biology from 1902 and started working in Assam, experimenting on the breeding of insects, particularly those feeding on tea plants. He then spent some time at the Forest Research Institute in Dehra Dun and at the Indian Museum under Nelson Annandale. He then went to live in Cambridge to study biology and then joined Imperial College to study entomology. After this he worked at the British Museum (Natural History) where he studied leaf beetles (Chrysomelidae) and from 1919 he published on the Indian members of the group contributing to The Fauna of British India, Including Ceylon and Burma series.

In 1919 he went briefly to work at the newly established department of zoology at Calcutta University, becoming the first professor of zoology there. The department had just one student in 1919, Durgadas Mukherji. Finding life uncongenial, Maulik returned to England in two years to continue his work on the Chrysomelidae. He also examined fossil insects from the Devonian period in Rhynie Chert along with Stanley Hirst. Maulik suggested that most clades within the Chrysomelidae were restricted to their host-plant lineages (termed as "Maulik's Law" by Pierre Jolivet) and he identified the apodeme on the tip of the hind-femora, the so-called "Maulik's organ", as a defining character of the flea-beetles, Alticinae ("Halticinae" in his time). He studied Chrysomelidae from around the world and described a very large number of taxa, nearly 56 genera and 300 species. He also worked on a few other groups outside of the Chrysomelidae including on the Neuroptera in collaboration with F. H. Gravely. A flea-beetle Maulika was named in his honour by Basu & Sengupta in 1980. He died of heart disease at his home in Chelsea at the age of 68.

Maulik wrote on a wide range of topics, particularly in the Bangalore Mail and was known for his forceful but logical explication of ideas. Titles of his essays included 'Science and Art', 'Education', 'Mysticism in Man', 'Ecology of Literature', and 'Why Scandal-Mongering is a Social Institution'. He held liberal views and was an atheist. A dry-brush sketch of him made by the artist Malcolm Osborne was exhibited at the Spring Exhibition of Royal Academy in 1932.

== Publication list ==
Maulik's publications include:

- Maulik, S. (1910). "Named specimens of Chrysomelidae in the Indian Museum". Records of the Indian Museum. 5 (3): 202–213.
- Gravely, F.G.; Maulik, S. (1911). "Notes on the development of some Indian Ascalaphidae and Myrmeleonidae". Records of the Indian Museum. 6 (2): 101–110. doi:10.5962/bhl.part.21330. S2CID 90410690.
- Maulik, S. (1913). "Cryptostomes from the Indian Museum". Records of the Indian Museum. 9 (2): 105–118.
- Maulik, S. (1913). "The Percy Sladen Trust Expedition to the Indian Ocean in 1905, under the leadership of Mr. J. Stanley Gardiner, M.A. Vol. 5. Coleoptera, Chrysomelidae: Hispinae of the Seychelles". Transactions of the Linnean Society of London, Zoology. Second Series. 16 (2): 237–242. doi:10.1111/j.1096-3642.1913.tb00117.x.
- Maulik, S. (1915). "Cryptostomes from the Indian Museum. Part II". Records of the Indian Museum. 11 (5): 367–381.
- Maulik, S. (1916). "A new Chlamys from Calcutta". Records of the Indian Museum. 12 (3): 101–103.
- Maulik, S. (1916). "On Cryptostome Beetles in the Cambridge University Museum of Zoology". Proceedings of the Zoological Society of London. 86 (4): 567–589. doi:10.1111/j.1096-3642.1916.tb02038.x.
- Maulik, S. (1917). "Cassidinae and Bruchidae from Seychelles islands and Aldabra". The Annals and Magazine of Natural History. Series 8. 19 (109): 144–146. doi:10.1080/00222931709486918.
- Maulik, S. (1917). "Notes on the subgenus Paradownesia Gestro". The Annals and Magazine of Natural History. Series 8. 20 (115): 130–132. doi:10.1080/00222931709486979.
- Maulik, S. (1918). "Variation in the prothoracic spines of Dactylispa xanthopus, Gestro". The Annals and Magazine of Natural History. Series 9. 1 (1): 70–74. doi:10.1080/00222931808562289.
- Maulik, S. (1918). "Note on Epistictia reicheana, Guérin". The Annals and Magazine of Natural History. Series 9. 1 (1): 74–76. doi:10.1080/00222931808562290.
- Maulik, S. (1918). "Note on Laccoptera vigintisex-notata, Boheman". The Annals and Magazine of Natural History. 9. 1 (4): 318–322. doi:10.1080/00222931808562320.
- Maulik, S. (1918). "Two new Indian Cassidinae beetles". The Annals and Magazine of Natural History. Series 9. 1 (4): 322–325. doi:10.1080/00222931808562321.
- Maulik, S. (1919). Chrysomelidae Volume 2. Hispinae and Cassidinae. Fauna of British India. London: Taylor & Francis.
- Maulik, S. (1919). "New Hispinae". The Annals and Magazine of Natural History. Series 9. 4 (24): 407–411. doi:10.1080/00222931908673910.
- Maulik, S. (1920). "A new hispid beetle injurious to the oil palm in the Gold Coast". Bulletin of Entomological Research. 10 (2): 171–174. doi:10.1017/S0007485300043972.
- Maulik, S. (1920). "A new Chlamys from Darjiling". Records of the Indian Museum. 19 (1): 19–21.
- Maulik, S. (1921). "Notes on Cryptostome Beetles". Records of the Indian Museum. 22 (1): 23–24.
- Maulik, S. (1921). "A new Hispid Beetle injurious to Nipa Palm". The Annals and Magazine of Natural History. Series 9. 7 (41): 451–452. doi:10.1080/00222932108632548.
- Maulik, S. (1921). "New Indian Drilid Beetles". Proceedings of the Zoological Society of London. 91 (3): 579–586. doi:10.1111/j.1096-3642.1921.tb03281.x.
- Maulik, S. (1922). "Two new African Hispid beetles". The Annals and Magazine of Natural History. Series 9. 9 (53): 569–570. doi:10.1080/00222932208632710.
- Maulik, S. (1923). "New Cryptostome Beetles". Proceedings of the Zoological Society of London. 93 (3–4): 599–608. doi:10.1111/j.1096-3642.1923.tb02199.x.
- Maulik, S. (1924). "A new hispid beetle injurious to oil palms in Brazil". Bulletin of Entomological Research. 14 (3): 245–246. doi:10.1017/S0007485300028315.
- Maulik, S.; Dover, C. (1924). "The larva and pupa of an Indian Cassidinae beetle (Prioptera decemmaculata Boh.)". Proceedings of the Zoological Society of London. 94 (4): 1087–1090. doi:10.1111/j.1096-3642.1924.tb03331.x.
- Maulik, S. (1924). "Note sur Callispa latipennis Pic (Col., Chrysomelidae)". Bulletin de la Société Entomologique de France. 29 (19): 217–218. doi:10.3406/bsef.1924.27399. S2CID 202425208.
- Maulik, S. (1925). "Note on the Nomenclature of the Coleopterous Genera Chrysomela, L., and Melasoma, Steph". The Annals and Magazine of Natural History. Series 9. 15 (85): 95–96. doi:10.1080/00222932508633184.
- Maulik, S. (1925). "Deuxième note sur Callispa latipennis Pic". The Entomologist. 58: 166–167.
- Hirst, S.; Maulik, S. (1926). "On some Arthropod Remains from the Rhynie Chert (Old Red Sandstone)". Geological Magazine. 63 (2): 69–71. Bibcode:1926GeoM...63...69H. doi:10.1017/S0016756800083692. S2CID 129777833.
- Maulik, S. (1926). Chrysomelidae Volume 3. Chrysomelinae and Halticinae. Fauna of British India. London: Taylor & Francis.
- Maulik, S. (1927). "Two new Hispinae (Col.) from Fiji and New Britain". Annals and Magazine of Natural History. Series 9. 20 (115): 105–108. doi:10.1080/00222932708655573.
- Maulik, S. (1928). "New Chrysomelid Beetles from India. With a Note on the Scales of Coleoptera". Proceedings of the Zoological Society of London. 98 (1): 151–161. doi:10.1111/j.1469-7998.1928.tb07146.x.
- Maulik, S. (1929). "Chrysomelidae; with a note on the comparative anatomy of some Halticine tibiae". Insects of Samoa. 4 (3): 177–215.
- Maulik, S. (1929). "New injurious Hispinae". Bulletin of Entomological Research. 20 (1): 81–94. doi:10.1017/S0007485300020964.
- Maulik, S. (1929). "On the Structure of the Hind Femur in Halticine Beetles". Proceedings of the Zoological Society of London. 99 (2): 305–308. doi:10.1111/j.1469-7998.1929.tb07744.x.
- Maulik, S. (1929). "Injurious Hispinae from the Solomon Islands". Bulletin of Entomological Research. 20 (2): 233–239. doi:10.1017/S0007485300021167.
- Maulik, S. (1930). "New injurious Hispinae". Bulletin of Entomological Research. 21 (1): 45–56. doi:10.1017/S0007485300021544.
- Maulik, S. (1931). "On the Larva of the Poisonous Chrysomelid Beetle of N'gamiland, Africa". Proceedings of the Zoological Society of London. 101 (3): 127–131. doi:10.1111/j.1469-7998.1931.tb06190.x.
- Maulik, S. (1931). "Coleoptera, Chrysomelidae, Eumolpinae, Galerucinae and Halticinae. Percy Sladen Trust Expedition to the Indian Ocean in 1905". Transactions of the Linnean Society of London, Zoology. Second Series. 19 (2): 241–260. doi:10.1111/j.1096-3642.1931.tb00128.x.
- Maulik, S. (1931). "On the Structure of Larvae of Hispine Beetles". Proceedings of the Zoological Society of London. 101 (3): 1137–1162. doi:10.1111/j.1096-3642.1931.tb01055.x.
- Maulik, S. (1932). "On the Structure of Larvae of Hispine Beetles-II". Proceedings of the Zoological Society of London. 102 (2): 293–322. doi:10.1111/j.1096-3642.1932.tb01078.x.
- Maulik, S. (1932). "A new Promecotheca (Col. Hispinae) from the Solomon Islands". Stylops. 1 (9): 204–205. doi:10.1111/j.1365-3113.1932.tb01383.x.
- Maulik, S. (1932). "On a Structure in the Antennae of Beetles of the Chrysomelid Genus Agetocera". Proceedings of the Zoological Society of London. 102 (4): 943–956. doi:10.1111/j.1096-3642.1932.tb01572.x.
- Maulik, S. (1933). "A new hispine beetle injurious to coconut". The Entomologist. 65 (847): 280–281.
- Maulik, S. (1933). "New Argentine Hispinae". The Annals and Magazine of Natural History. Series 10. 11 (65): 605–609. doi:10.1080/00222933308673693.
- Maulik, S. (1933). "On the Structure of Larvae of Hispine Beetles. III". Proceedings of the Zoological Society of London. 103 (3): 669–680. doi:10.1111/j.1096-3642.1933.tb01613.x.
- Maulik, S. (1933). "On the Structure of Larvae of Hispine Beetles. IV". Proceedings of the Zoological Society of London. 103 (4): 935–939. doi:10.1111/j.1096-3642.1933.tb01636.x.
- Maulik, S. (1933). "A new Galerucine Beetle from China". The Annals and Magazine of Natural History. Series 10. 12 (72): 563–564. doi:10.1080/00222933308673721.
- Maulik, S. (1933). "A new Oriental hispine beetle". The Entomologist. 66 (839): 90–91.
- Maulik, S. (1934). "Argopistes hoenei spec. nov. ln: Hering, M.: Minen von Shanghai, gesammelt von H. Hoene. I. mit Beschreibung einer neuen Argopistes-Art (Col. Haltic.)". Mitteilungen der Deutschen Entomologischen Gesellschaft. 5 (3–4): 23–28.
- Maulik, S. (1935). "A new Hispine Beetle from the Solomon Islands". Annals and Magazine of Natural History. Series 10. 15 (90): 653–656. doi:10.1080/00222933508655014.
- Maulik, S. (1935). "Chrysomelidae". In Van Straelen, V. (ed.). Résultats Scientifiques du Voyage aux Indes Orientales Néerlandaises de LL. AA. RR. le Prince et la Princesse Léopold de Belgique (PDF). Bruxelles: Musée Royal d'Histoire Naturelle de Belgique. pp. 2–34.
- Maulik, S. (1936). Chrysomelidae Volume 4. Galerucinae Fauna of British India. London: Taylor & Francis.
- Maulik, S. (1936). "A new Brazilian Hispine Beetle". The Annals and Magazine of Natural History. Series 10. 18 (105): 392‑397. doi:10.1080/00222933608655207.
- Maulik, S. (1936). "Notes on Hispine Beetles". The Annals and Magazine of Natural History. Series 10. 18 (105): 397‑402. doi:10.1080/00222933608655208.
- Maulik, S. (1937). "Distributional Correlation between Hispine Beetles and their Host-plants". Proceedings of the Zoological Society of London. Series A. 107 (2): 129–159. doi:10.1111/j.1469-7998.1937.tb00001.x.
- Maulik, S. (1937). "A new Hispine beetle from Java". The Annals and Magazine of Natural History. Series 10. 20 (116): 238–239. doi:10.1080/00222933708655338.
- Maulik, S. (1938). "On the structure of larvae of hispine beetles-V". Proceedings of the Zoological Society of London. Series B. 108 (1): 49–71. doi:10.1111/j.1096-3642.1938.tb00023.x.
- Maulik, S. (1939). "The Correlation between Colour-pattern and Structure in Insects". The Annals and Magazine of Natural History. Series 11. 3 (14): 230–235. doi:10.1080/03745481.1939.9723596.
- Maulik, S. (1939). "The geographic distribution of European hispine beetles (Chrysomelide, Coleoptera)". Proceedings of the Zoological Society of London. Series B. 109 (2): 131–152. doi:10.1111/j.1096-3642.1939.tb00708.x.
- Maulik, S. (1940). "The food plant of Platyauchenia latreillei (Castelnau) (Hispinae, Chrysomelidae, Coleoptera)". The Annals and Magazine of Natural History. Series 11. 5 (26): 256. doi:10.1080/00222934008527043.
- Maulik, S. (1941). "Biology and Morphology of the Sagrinae (Chrysomelidae, Coleoptera)". The Annals and Magazine of Natural History. Series 11. 7 (38): 235–254. doi:10.1080/00222934108527152.
- Maulik, S. (1946). "A new species of Brontispa from the Pacific (Hispinae, Chrysomelidae, Coleoptera)". The Annals and Magazine of Natural History. Series 11. 13 (103): 498–502. doi:10.1080/00222934608654571.
- Maulik, S. (1947). "Notes on some Chrysomelidae from China". The Annals and Magazine of Natural History. Series 11. 14 (110): 150–152. doi:10.1080/00222934708654620.
- Maulik, S. (1947). "Some Insects as Food of a Frog (Rana esculenta L.)". The Annals and Magazine of Natural History. Series 11. 14 (111): 224. doi:10.1080/00222934708654629.
- Maulik, S. (1947). "Larva of Thlaspida biramosa Boheman (Cassidinae, Chrysomelidae, Coleoptera)". The Annals and Magazine of Natural History. Series 11. 14 (118): 672–676. doi:10.1080/00222934708654679.
- Maulik, S. (1947). "Willow as Host-Plant of Crioceris merdigera". Nature. 160 (4070): 609–610. Bibcode:1947Natur.160..609M. doi:10.1038/160609b0. S2CID 4081547.
- Maulik, S. (1948). "Early stages and habits of Sindia clathrata (Fabricius) (Cassidinae, Chrysomelidae, Coleoptera)". The Annals and Magazine of Natural History. Series 12. 1 (5): 368–371. doi:10.1080/00222934808653916.
- Maulik, S. (1948). "Larva of Echoma decipiens (Boheman, 1854) (Cassidinae, Chrysomelidae, Coleoptera)". The Annals and Magazine of Natural History. Series 12. 1 (11): 821–825. doi:10.1080/00222934808653948.
- Maulik, S. (1949). "Larva and pupa of Botryonopa sanguinea Guérin, 1840 (Hispinae, Chrysomelidae, Coleoptera)". The Annals and Magazine of Natural History. Series 12. 2 (20): 628–633. doi:10.1080/00222934908654010.
- Maulik, S. (1949). "Immature stages of the British chrysomelid I. Pilemostoma fastuosa (Schaller) (Cassid.)". The Annals and Magazine of Natural History. Series 12. 2 (20): 633–638. doi:10.1080/00222934908654011.
- Maulik, S. (1950). "The larva and pupa of Brontispa namorikia Maulik (Coleoptera: Chrysomelidae: Hispinae)" (PDF). Proceedings of the Hawaiian Entomological Society. 14 (1): 167–171.
