= Hummingbird vine =

Hummingbird vine is common name that may refer to several climbing plants associated with hummingbirds. They are often planted in American gardens to attract these birds.

- Campsis radicans (trumpet vine) of the trumpet-creeper family (Bignoniaceae)
- Ipomoea quamoclit (cypress vine) of the bindweed family (Convolvulaceae)

== See also ==
- Ornithophily
- Hummingbird bush
- Hummingbird flower
