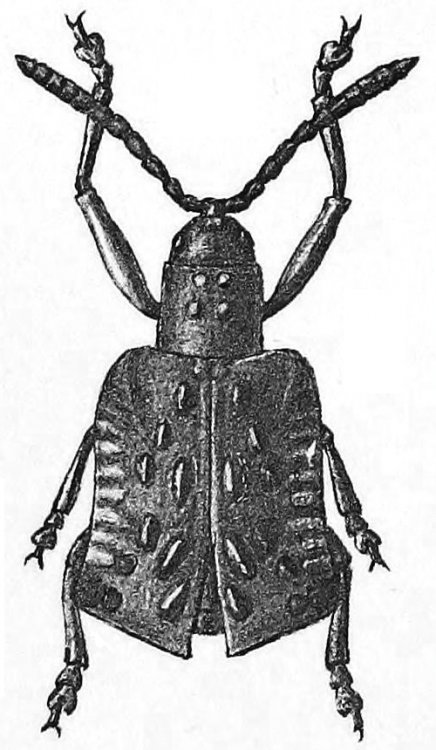

Scientific classification
- Kingdom: Animalia
- Phylum: Arthropoda
- Class: Insecta
- Order: Coleoptera
- Suborder: Polyphaga
- Infraorder: Cucujiformia
- Family: Chrysomelidae
- Genus: Oncocephala
- Species: O. promontorii

Binomial name
- Oncocephala promontorii Péringuey, 1898

Synonyms
- Oncocephala kolbei Gestro, 1899; Oncocephala angulata Kolbe, 1897 (not Gestro)

= Oncocephala promontorii =

Species of beetle

Oncocephala promontorii is a species of beetle of the family Chrysomelidae. It is found in Angola, the Democratic Republic of the Congo, Kenya, Rwanda, Tanzania, Mozambique, South Africa and Zimbabwe.

== Description ==
Adults reach a length of about 3.8–5 mm. The head, pronotum, elytra and antennae are charcoal black with a light to dark brownish tinge, while the legs are dark brownish with a black tinge.

== Life history ==
The recorded host plants for this species are Ipomoea batatas, Ipomoea purpurea, Mina lobata, Ipomoea cairica, Ipomoea coccinea, Ipomoea ficifolia, Ipomoea obscura, Ipomoea wightii, Convolvulus arvensis and Convolvulus farinosus.
