= Oncocephala feae =

Scientific classification
- Kingdom: Animalia
- Phylum: Arthropoda
- Class: Insecta
- Order: Coleoptera
- Suborder: Polyphaga
- Infraorder: Cucujiformia
- Family: Chrysomelidae
- Genus: Oncocephala
- Species: O. feae

Binomial name
- Oncocephala feae Gestro, 1899

Synonyms
- Oncocephala bicristata Baly, 1888 (not Chapuis)

Species of beetle

Oncocephala feae is a species of beetle of the family Chrysomelidae. It is found in Myanmar and Vietnam.

== Life history ==
No host plant has been documented for this species.
