= Oncocephala basilewskyi =

Scientific classification
- Kingdom: Animalia
- Phylum: Arthropoda
- Class: Insecta
- Order: Coleoptera
- Suborder: Polyphaga
- Infraorder: Cucujiformia
- Family: Chrysomelidae
- Genus: Oncocephala
- Species: O. basilewskyi

Binomial name
- Oncocephala basilewskyi Uhmann, 1954

Species of beetle

Oncocephala basilewskyi is a species of beetle of the family Chrysomelidae. It is found in the Democratic Republic of the Congo and Rwanda.

== Description ==
Adults reach a length of about 5.2–6.5 mm. The head, pronotum, elytra, antennae and legs are all light brownish with a black tinge.

== Life history ==
No host plant has been documented for this species.
