= Prionispa clavata =

Scientific classification
- Kingdom: Animalia
- Phylum: Arthropoda
- Class: Insecta
- Order: Coleoptera
- Suborder: Polyphaga
- Infraorder: Cucujiformia
- Family: Chrysomelidae
- Genus: Prionispa
- Species: P. clavata

Binomial name
- Prionispa clavata (Yu, 1992)

Synonyms
- Chaeridiona clavata Yu, 1992

Species of beetle

Prionispa clavata is a species of beetle of the family Chrysomelidae. It is found in China (Hunan).

== Life history ==
No host plant has been documented for this species.
