= Prionispa longicornis =

Scientific classification
- Kingdom: Animalia
- Phylum: Arthropoda
- Class: Insecta
- Order: Coleoptera
- Suborder: Polyphaga
- Infraorder: Cucujiformia
- Family: Chrysomelidae
- Genus: Prionispa
- Species: P. longicornis

Binomial name
- Prionispa longicornis Gestro, 1906

Species of beetle

Prionispa longicornis is a species of beetle of the family Chrysomelidae. It is found in India (Sikkim, West Bengal) and Myanmar.

== Life history ==
No host plant has been documented for this species.
