= Oncocephala atratangula =

Scientific classification
- Kingdom: Animalia
- Phylum: Arthropoda
- Class: Insecta
- Order: Coleoptera
- Suborder: Polyphaga
- Infraorder: Cucujiformia
- Family: Chrysomelidae
- Genus: Oncocephala
- Species: O. atratangula

Binomial name
- Oncocephala atratangula Gressitt, 1938

Species of beetle

Oncocephala atratangula is a species of beetle of the family Chrysomelidae. It is found in China (Guangxi, Hainan, Yunnan).

== Life history ==
The recorded host plant for this species is Commelina communis.
