= Oncocephala acutangula =

Scientific classification
- Kingdom: Animalia
- Phylum: Arthropoda
- Class: Insecta
- Order: Coleoptera
- Suborder: Polyphaga
- Infraorder: Cucujiformia
- Family: Chrysomelidae
- Genus: Oncocephala
- Species: O. acutangula

Binomial name
- Oncocephala acutangula Gestro, 1917

Species of beetle

Oncocephala acutangula is a species of beetle of the family Chrysomelidae. It is found in the Philippines (Luzon, Visayas).

== Description ==
Adults reach a length of about 4.8–5.3 mm. The head, pronotum, elytra and legs are pale brown with a black tinge, while the antennae are black with a dark brown tinge, becoming pale brown towards the apex.

== Life history ==
The recorded host plants for this species are orchids (Orchidaceae).
