= Chaeridiona cupreovirida =

Scientific classification
- Kingdom: Animalia
- Phylum: Arthropoda
- Class: Insecta
- Order: Coleoptera
- Suborder: Polyphaga
- Infraorder: Cucujiformia
- Family: Chrysomelidae
- Genus: Chaeridiona
- Species: C. cupreovirida

Binomial name
- Chaeridiona cupreovirida Gressitt, 1950

Species of beetle

Chaeridiona cupreovirida is a species of beetle of the family Chrysomelidae. It is found in China (Fujian).

== Description ==
Adults reach a length of about 3.75–3.9 mm. They have a shiny metallic golden green head, pronotal disc and elytral disc. The elytra itself are testaceous apically on the explanate margins, except for the exterior angle which is bronzy and the apical margin which is yellowish. The antennae are reddish.

== Life history ==
No host plant has been documented for this species.
