= Oncocephala deleoni =

Scientific classification
- Kingdom: Animalia
- Phylum: Arthropoda
- Class: Insecta
- Order: Coleoptera
- Suborder: Polyphaga
- Infraorder: Cucujiformia
- Family: Chrysomelidae
- Genus: Oncocephala
- Species: O. deleoni

Binomial name
- Oncocephala deleoni Calcetas, Staines & Adorada, 2021

Species of beetle

Oncocephala deleoni is a species of beetle of the family Chrysomelidae. It is found in the Democratic Republic of the Congo.

== Description ==
Adults reach a length of about 7 mm. The head and pronotum are dark brown with a blackish tinge, while the elytra are dark yellow to dark brown with a blackish tinge. The legs are dark brown with a blackish tinge and the antennae are light orange.

== Life history ==
No host plant has been documented for this species.

== Etymology ==
The species is named after Executive Director John de Leon of the Philippine Rice Research Institute (PhilRice), Munoz, Nueva Ecija, Philippines.
