= Chaeridiona angulata =

Scientific classification
- Kingdom: Animalia
- Phylum: Arthropoda
- Class: Insecta
- Order: Coleoptera
- Suborder: Polyphaga
- Infraorder: Cucujiformia
- Family: Chrysomelidae
- Genus: Chaeridiona
- Species: C. angulata

Binomial name
- Chaeridiona angulata Staines, 2007

Species of beetle

Chaeridiona angulata is a species of beetle of the family Chrysomelidae. It is found in Laos.

== Description ==
Adults reach a length of about 3.6 mm. They have a shiny metallic green head, pronotum and elytral disc. The elytra itself are coppery to yellowish laterally and apically. The antennae and legs are yellowish.

== Life history ==
The recorded host plants for this species are Zingiber species.

== Etymology ==
The species name is derived from Latin angulus (meaning corner or angle) and refers to the distinctly angulate exterior apical angle of the elytra.
