= Chaeridiona picea =

Scientific classification
- Kingdom: Animalia
- Phylum: Arthropoda
- Class: Insecta
- Order: Coleoptera
- Suborder: Polyphaga
- Infraorder: Cucujiformia
- Family: Chrysomelidae
- Genus: Chaeridiona
- Species: C. picea

Binomial name
- Chaeridiona picea Baly, 1869

Species of beetle

Chaeridiona picea is a species of beetle of the family Chrysomelidae. It is found in India (Madhya Pradesh, Maharashtra, Odisha, West Bengal).

== Description ==
Adults reach a length of about 5 mm. They are piceous, the pronotum and elytra with a slight metallic purplish tinge. The apex of the elytra is dark brown, while the legs are light brown or yellowish.

== Life history ==
Larvae have been reared from Commelina species, while adults have been collected on Commelina bengalensis and Commelina nudiflora.
