= Oncocephala proxima =

Scientific classification
- Kingdom: Animalia
- Phylum: Arthropoda
- Class: Insecta
- Order: Coleoptera
- Suborder: Polyphaga
- Infraorder: Cucujiformia
- Family: Chrysomelidae
- Genus: Oncocephala
- Species: O. proxima

Binomial name
- Oncocephala proxima Gestro, 1899

Species of beetle

Oncocephala proxima is a species of beetle of the family Chrysomelidae. It is found in Cameroon, the Democratic Republic of the Congo, Ethiopia, Gabon, Guinea, Ivory Coast, Nigeria, Senegal, Sierra Leone, Tanzania, Togo and Uganda.

== Description ==
Adults reach a length of about 4.6–5.7 mm. The head, pronotum, elytra and antennae are black with a light brownish tinge, while the legs are light brownish.

== Life history ==
The recorded host plants for this species are grasses and Ipomoea species.
