= Oncocephala inchoans =

Scientific classification
- Kingdom: Animalia
- Phylum: Arthropoda
- Class: Insecta
- Order: Coleoptera
- Suborder: Polyphaga
- Infraorder: Cucujiformia
- Family: Chrysomelidae
- Genus: Oncocephala
- Species: O. inchoans

Binomial name
- Oncocephala inchoans Uhmann, 1954

Species of beetle

Oncocephala inchoans is a species of beetle of the family Chrysomelidae. It is found in the Democratic Republic of the Congo.

== Description ==
Adults reach a length of about 5.1–5.2 mm. The head, pronotum, elytra, legs and antennae are dark brownish to black and with a light brownish tinge.

== Life history ==
No host plant has been documented for this species.
