= Prionispa houjayi =

Scientific classification
- Kingdom: Animalia
- Phylum: Arthropoda
- Class: Insecta
- Order: Coleoptera
- Suborder: Polyphaga
- Infraorder: Cucujiformia
- Family: Chrysomelidae
- Genus: Prionispa
- Species: P. houjayi

Binomial name
- Prionispa houjayi Lee et al., 2009

Species of beetle

Prionispa houjayi is a species of beetle of the family Chrysomelidae. It is found in Taiwan.

== Description ==
Larvae
Larvae reach a length of about 4.4–5 mm and have a yellowish-brown body.

Adults
Adults reach a length of about 3.9-4.6 mm. They are blackish-brown, while the antennae are mostly whitish-yellow (with antenomeres I-II and VII-XI dark brown). The legs are mostly whitish-yellow.

== Life history ==
The recorded host plant for this species is Disporum kawakamii. They mine the leaves of their host plant. The species is thought to be univoltine.

== Etymology ==
The species name honors Mr. Hou-Jay Chen, who discovered the species.
