= Oncocephala insignis =

Scientific classification
- Kingdom: Animalia
- Phylum: Arthropoda
- Class: Insecta
- Order: Coleoptera
- Suborder: Polyphaga
- Infraorder: Cucujiformia
- Family: Chrysomelidae
- Genus: Oncocephala
- Species: O. insignis

Binomial name
- Oncocephala insignis Gestro, 1899

Species of beetle

Oncocephala insignis is a species of beetle of the family Chrysomelidae. It is found in Kenya, Uganda, the Democratic Republic of the Congo, Rwanda and Tanzania.

== Description ==
Adults reach a length of about 5.5–6.3 mm. The head, pronotum, elytra, legs and antennae are yellow with a brown-reddish tinge.

== Life history ==
No host plant has been documented for this species.
