= Oncocephala gestroi =

Scientific classification
- Kingdom: Animalia
- Phylum: Arthropoda
- Class: Insecta
- Order: Coleoptera
- Suborder: Polyphaga
- Infraorder: Cucujiformia
- Family: Chrysomelidae
- Genus: Oncocephala
- Species: O. gestroi

Binomial name
- Oncocephala gestroi Weise, 1899

Species of beetle

Oncocephala gestroi is a species of beetle of the family Chrysomelidae. It is found in Ethiopia, Burundi, Rwanda, Tanzania and South Africa.

== Description ==
Adults reach a length of about 4.6–5 mm. The head, antennae and legs are dark brownish, while the pronotum and elytra are light brownish with a black tinge.

== Life history ==
The recorded host plant for this species is Oryza sativa.
