= Oncocephala dimaculanganae =

Scientific classification
- Kingdom: Animalia
- Phylum: Arthropoda
- Class: Insecta
- Order: Coleoptera
- Suborder: Polyphaga
- Infraorder: Cucujiformia
- Family: Chrysomelidae
- Genus: Oncocephala
- Species: O. dimaculanganae

Binomial name
- Oncocephala dimaculanganae Calcetas, Staines & Adorada, 2021

Species of beetle

Oncocephala dimaculanganae is a species of beetle of the family Chrysomelidae. It is found in Cameroon.

== Description ==
Adults reach a length of about 5 mm. The head, pronotum and elytra are black with a dark brown tinge, while the legs are dark brown with a blackish tinge.

== Life history ==
No host plant has been documented for this species.

== Etymology ==
The species is named after the Regional Executive Director (RED) Vilma M. Dimaculangan of the Department of Agriculture, Regional Field Unit-IV-CALABARZON, Maraouy, Lipa City, Batangas, Philippines.
