= Oncocephala tuberculata =

Scientific classification
- Kingdom: Animalia
- Phylum: Arthropoda
- Clade: Pancrustacea
- Class: Insecta
- Order: Coleoptera
- Suborder: Polyphaga
- Infraorder: Cucujiformia
- Family: Chrysomelidae
- Genus: Oncocephala
- Species: O. tuberculata

Binomial name
- Oncocephala tuberculata (Olivier, 1792)

Synonyms
- Hispa tuberculata Olivier, 1792; Oncocephala formosana Chûjô, 1933

Species of beetle

Oncocephala tuberculata is a species of beetle of the family Chrysomelidae. It is found in China, India, Indonesia (Java), Laos, Nepal and Taiwan.

== Life history ==
The recorded host plants for this species are Ipomoea sepiaria and Ipomoea batatas.
