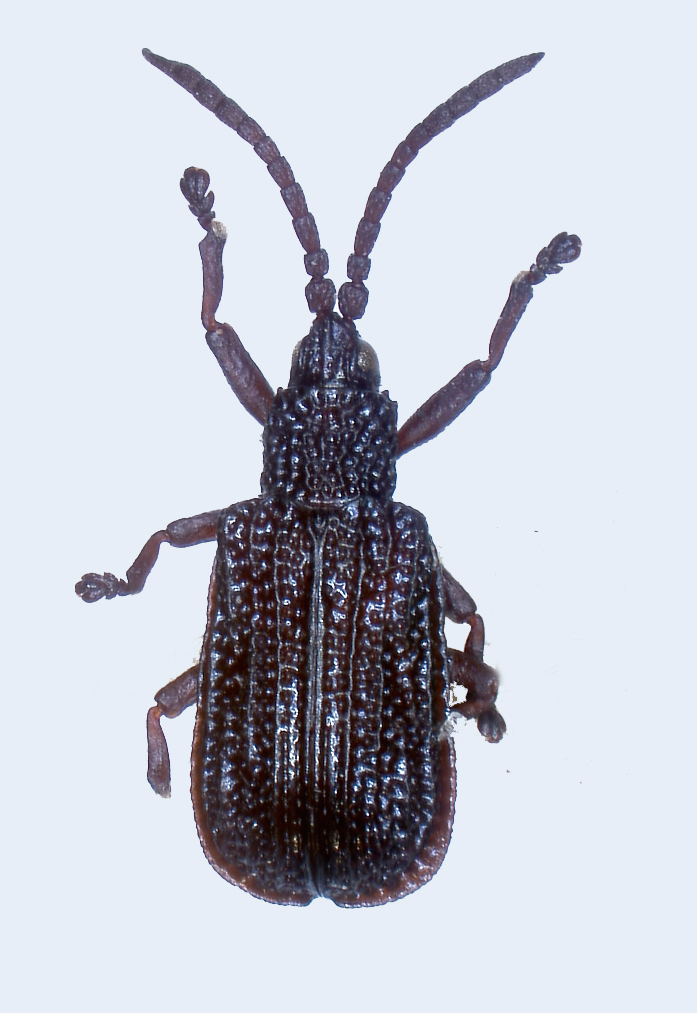

Scientific classification
- Kingdom: Animalia
- Phylum: Arthropoda
- Class: Insecta
- Order: Coleoptera
- Suborder: Polyphaga
- Infraorder: Cucujiformia
- Family: Chrysomelidae
- Genus: Chaeridiona
- Species: C. feae

Binomial name
- Chaeridiona feae Gestro, 1890

= Chaeridiona feae =

Species of beetle

Chaeridiona feae is a species of beetle of the family Chrysomelidae. It is found in Myanmar.

== Description ==
Adults reach a length of about 4.1–4.6 mm. They are shining black with a metallic purplish sheen. The antennae and legs are brownish-black.

== Life history ==
No host plant has been documented for this species.
