= Hummingbird flower =

Hummingbird flower or hummingbird-flower is a common name that may refer to several flowering plants associated with hummingbirds, including:

- Bouvardia ternifolia, a species in the coffee family native to Mexico and the south-western United States
- Epilobium canum, a species in the evening-primrose family native to the western United States
- Ipomopsis aggregata, a species in the phlox family native to western North America from northern Mexico to British Columbia
- Justicia purpusii, a species in the acanthus family native to north-western Mexico
- Macranthera flammea, a species in the evening-primrose family native to the south-eastern United States
- Penstemon barbatus, a species in the veronica family native to the southwestern US and most of Mexico
Plants named Hummingbird flower
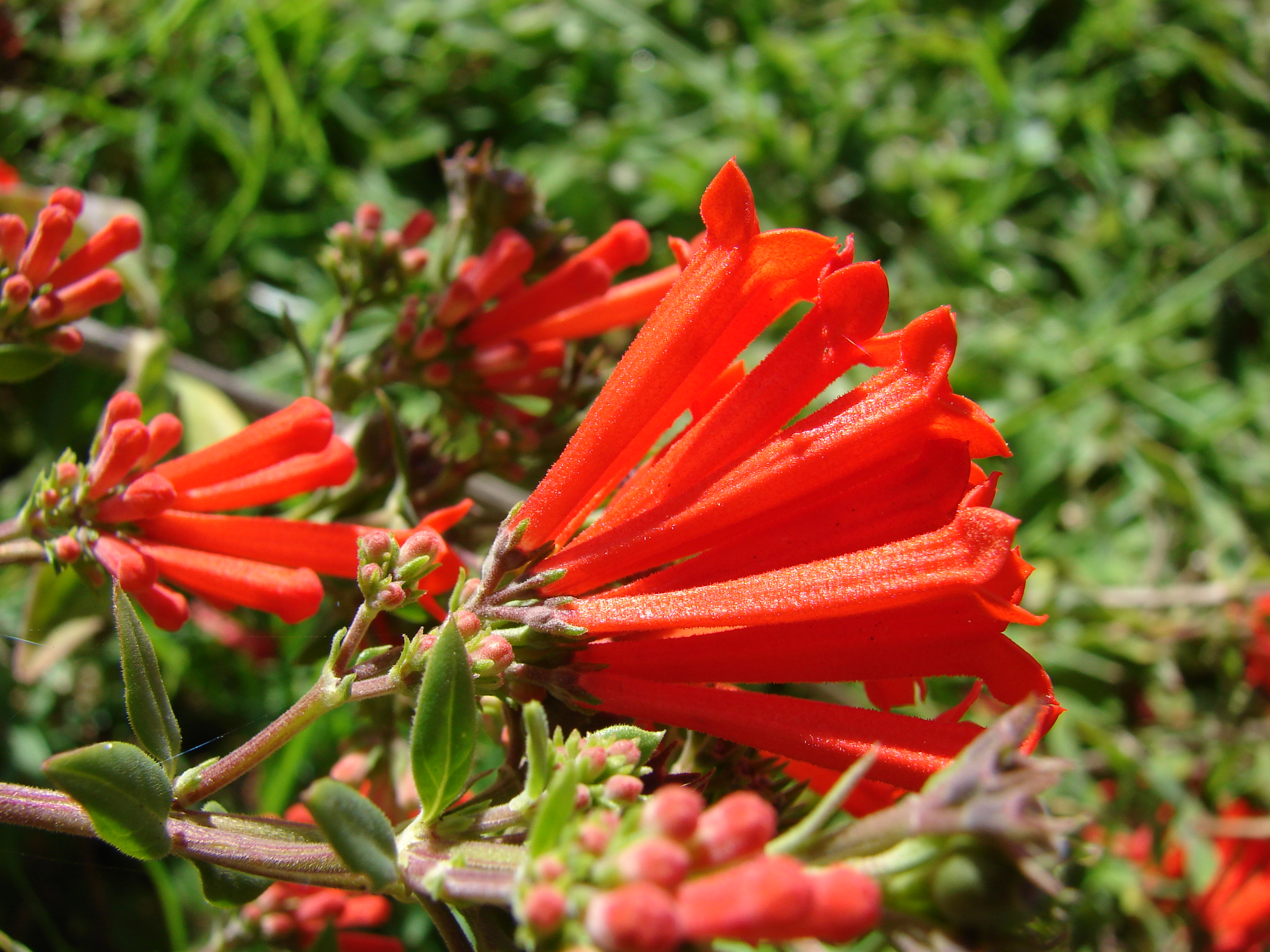
Bouvardia ternifolia

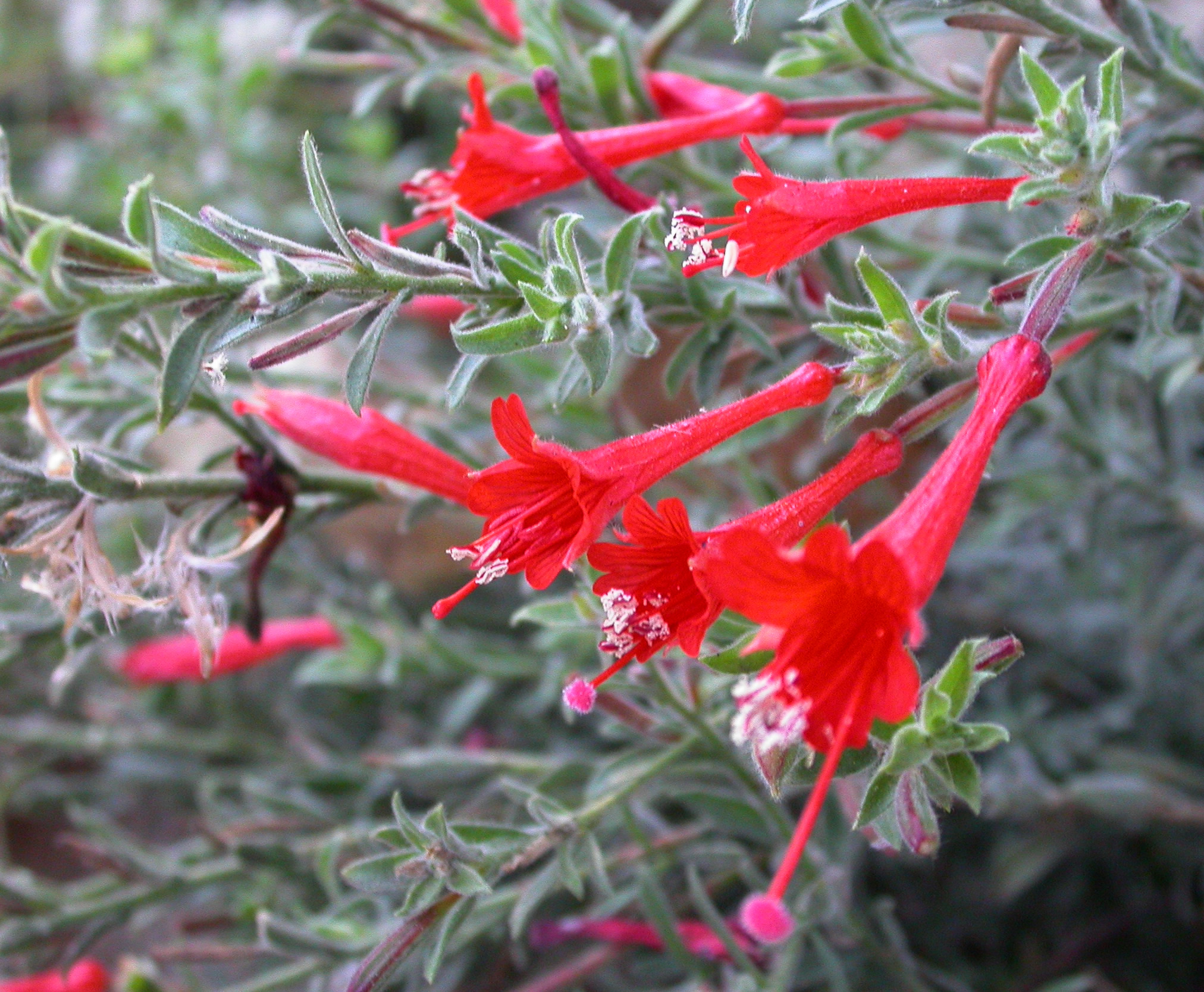
Epilobium canum

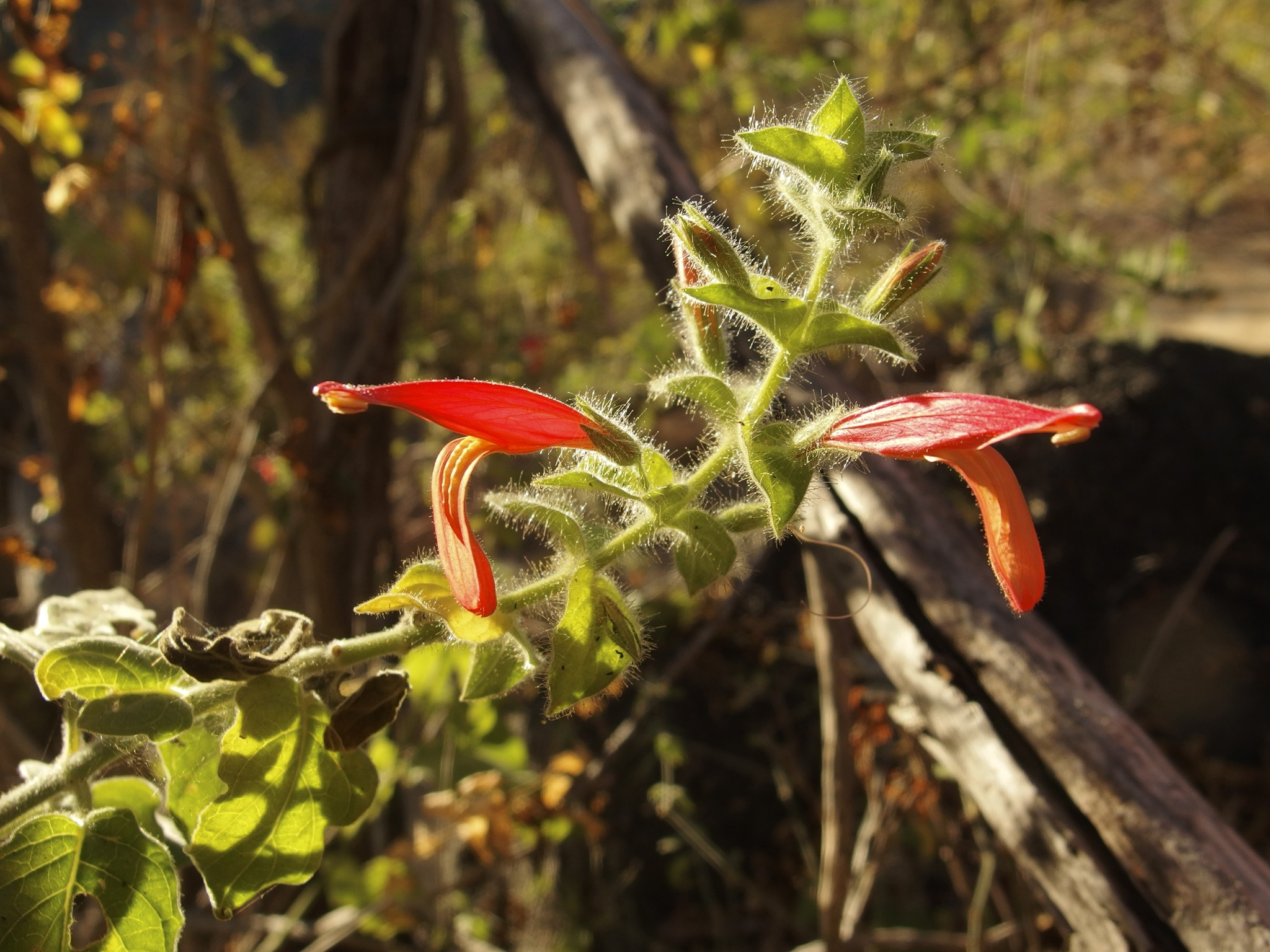
Justicia purpusii

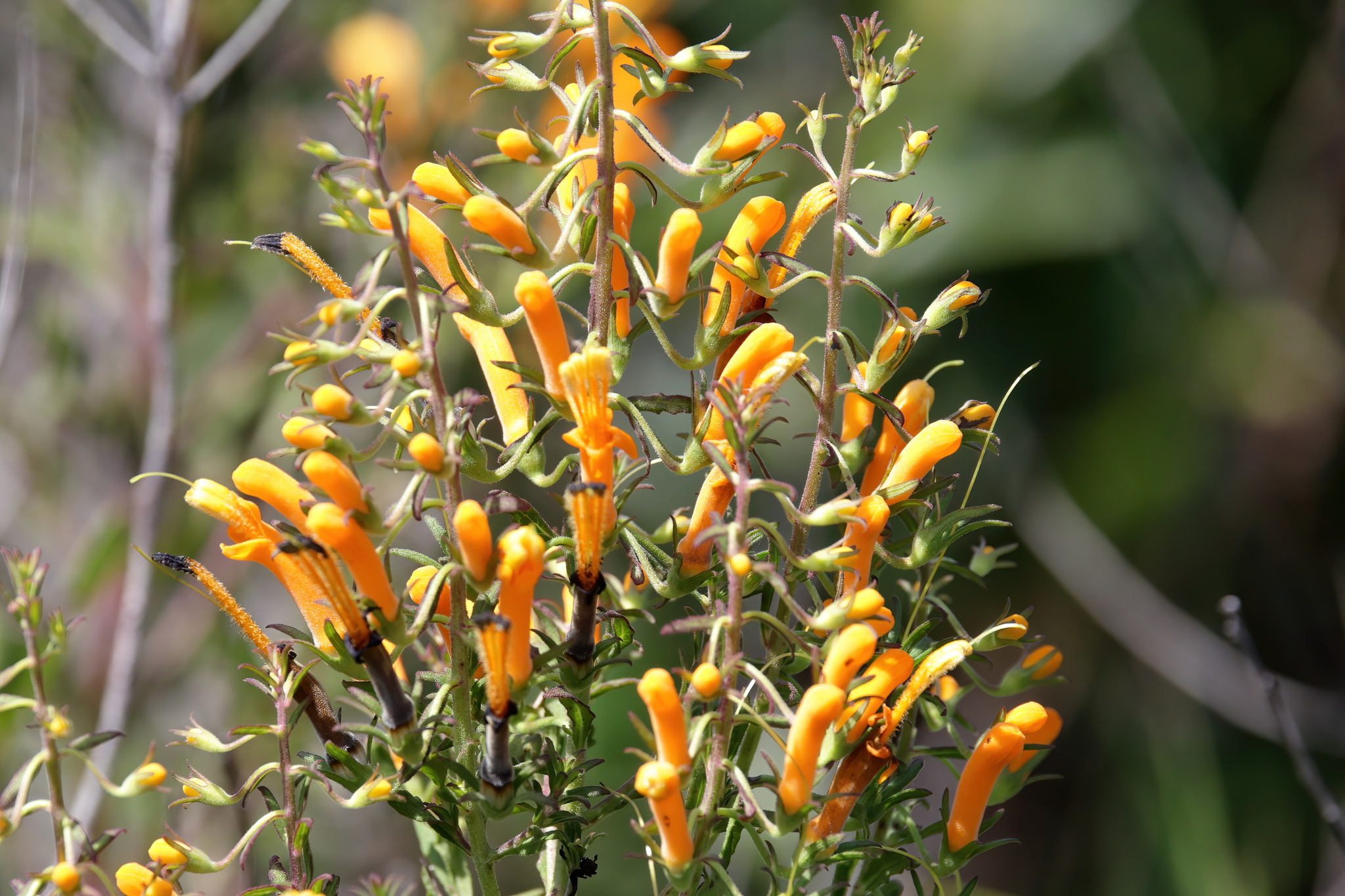
Macranthera flammea

Hummingbird flower is also a group term for those plants (a subset of ornithophiles) adapted to pollination by hummingbirds.

== See also ==
- Hummingbird bush
- Hummingbird vine
