= Chaeridiona metallica =

Scientific classification
- Kingdom: Animalia
- Phylum: Arthropoda
- Class: Insecta
- Order: Coleoptera
- Suborder: Polyphaga
- Infraorder: Cucujiformia
- Family: Chrysomelidae
- Genus: Chaeridiona
- Species: C. metallica

Binomial name
- Chaeridiona metallica Baly, 1869

Species of beetle

Chaeridiona metallica is a species of beetle of the family Chrysomelidae. It is found in India (Karnataka, Kerala, Madhya Pradesh, Maharashtra, Tamil Nadu).

== Description ==
Adults reach a length of about 4.9–5 mm. The pronotum and elytra are metallic green in the middle and purplish-red laterally, while the legs and apex of the elytra are light brown.

== Life history ==
The recorded host plants for this species are Curcuma species.
