= Oncocephala severinii =

Scientific classification
- Kingdom: Animalia
- Phylum: Arthropoda
- Class: Insecta
- Order: Coleoptera
- Suborder: Polyphaga
- Infraorder: Cucujiformia
- Family: Chrysomelidae
- Genus: Oncocephala
- Species: O. severinii

Binomial name
- Oncocephala severinii Gestro, 1899

Synonyms
- Oncocephala scabrosa Gestro, 1905

Species of beetle

Oncocephala severinii is a species of beetle of the family Chrysomelidae. It is found in Angola, Guinea-Bissau, Liberia, Togo, Cameroon, the Democratic Republic of the Congo, Equatorial Guinea and Kenya.

== Description ==
Adults reach a length of about 4.5–5.8 mm. The head, pronotum, elytra, legs and antennae are black with a brownish to orange tinge, which is more visible on the elytral costae and pronotal tubercles.

== Life history ==
No host plant has been documented for this species.
