= Oncocephala polilloana =

Scientific classification
- Kingdom: Animalia
- Phylum: Arthropoda
- Class: Insecta
- Order: Coleoptera
- Suborder: Polyphaga
- Infraorder: Cucujiformia
- Family: Chrysomelidae
- Genus: Oncocephala
- Species: O. polilloana

Binomial name
- Oncocephala polilloana Uhmann, 1931

Species of beetle

Oncocephala polilloana is a species of beetle of the family Chrysomelidae. It is found in the Philippines (Luzon, Mindanao).

== Description ==
Adults reach a length of about 5–5.9 mm. The head, pronotum, elytra and legs are dark brown with a black tinge, while the antennae are dark brown, with the apical antennomere paler.

== Life history ==
No host plant has been documented for this species.
