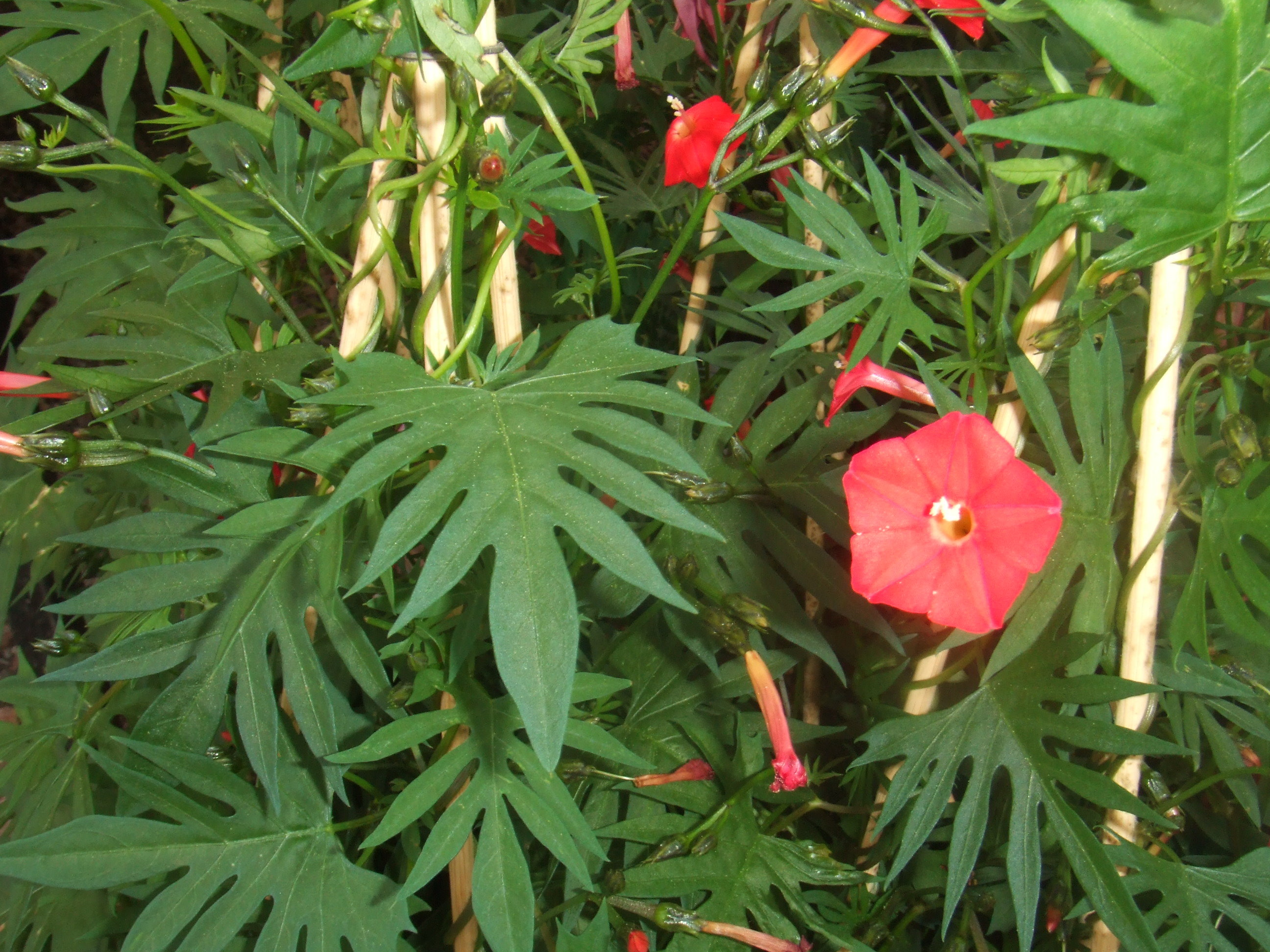

Scientific classification
- Kingdom: Plantae
- Clade: Embryophytes
- Clade: Tracheophytes
- Clade: Angiosperms
- Clade: Eudicots
- Clade: Asterids
- Order: Solanales
- Family: Convolvulaceae
- Genus: Ipomoea
- Species: I. × sloteri

Binomial name
- Ipomoea × sloteri (House) Ooststr.

= Ipomoea × sloteri =

Species of flowering plant

Ipomoea × sloteri is an allotetraploid species derived from Ipomoea × multifida, i.e., descended from a hybrid of I. coccinea and I. quamoclit; it is sometimes referred to as I. x multifida, though technically that name refers only to direct hybrids of I. coccinea and I. quamoclit. It is a cultivated species with no natural range. Like Ipomoea × multifida, it is known as cardinal climber.

== Description ==
I. sloteri is a climbing vine, growing up to 10 feet (3.0 m) in height; its flattened, twining stems bear alternate leaves. Like I. quamoclit it has palmate leaves with deep incisions, but the lobes are somewhat longer and the incisions somewhat less deep; usually the leaves have 3 to 7 lobes on each side plus a terminal lobe. Like both parent species it bears bright-red trumpet-shaped flowers; these have five petals, forming a pentagon shape when opened. A style and five stamens protrude from the flower. The plant first blooms in mid-summer, and keeps producing flowers continuously even without deadheading. The fruit are round and initially green but dry to become brown and papery; each contains two to four seeds, typical in shape for a morning glory.

The seeds are fertile, and the plant breeds true. However, the seeds require scarification or soaking to germinate quickly, and may not germinate on their own in colder climates.

As the parent species are both tropical, the plant is killed by frost, and can thus be grown in temperate climates only as an annual. It grows best in well-drained soil, hot weather, and full sunlight, and is somewhat drought-tolerant.

== History ==
I. sloteri was developed in 1908 by Morgan Sloter of Columbus, Ohio, who had been creating hybrids of I. quantoclit (as the pollen source) and I. coccinea since 1897; only in that year did one of his hybrid plants produce one fertile seed, from which I. sloteri derives.
