= Oncocephala methneri =

Scientific classification
- Kingdom: Animalia
- Phylum: Arthropoda
- Class: Insecta
- Order: Coleoptera
- Suborder: Polyphaga
- Infraorder: Cucujiformia
- Family: Chrysomelidae
- Genus: Oncocephala
- Species: O. methneri

Binomial name
- Oncocephala methneri Uhmann, 1928

Species of beetle

Oncocephala methneri is a species of beetle of the family Chrysomelidae. It is found in Tanzania and Congo.

== Description ==
Adults reach a length of about 6.5 mm. They are oblong, shiny, smooth and reddish-yellow, the elytra with the protuberances and parts of the markings pitch-dark.

== Life history ==
No host plant has been documented for this species.
