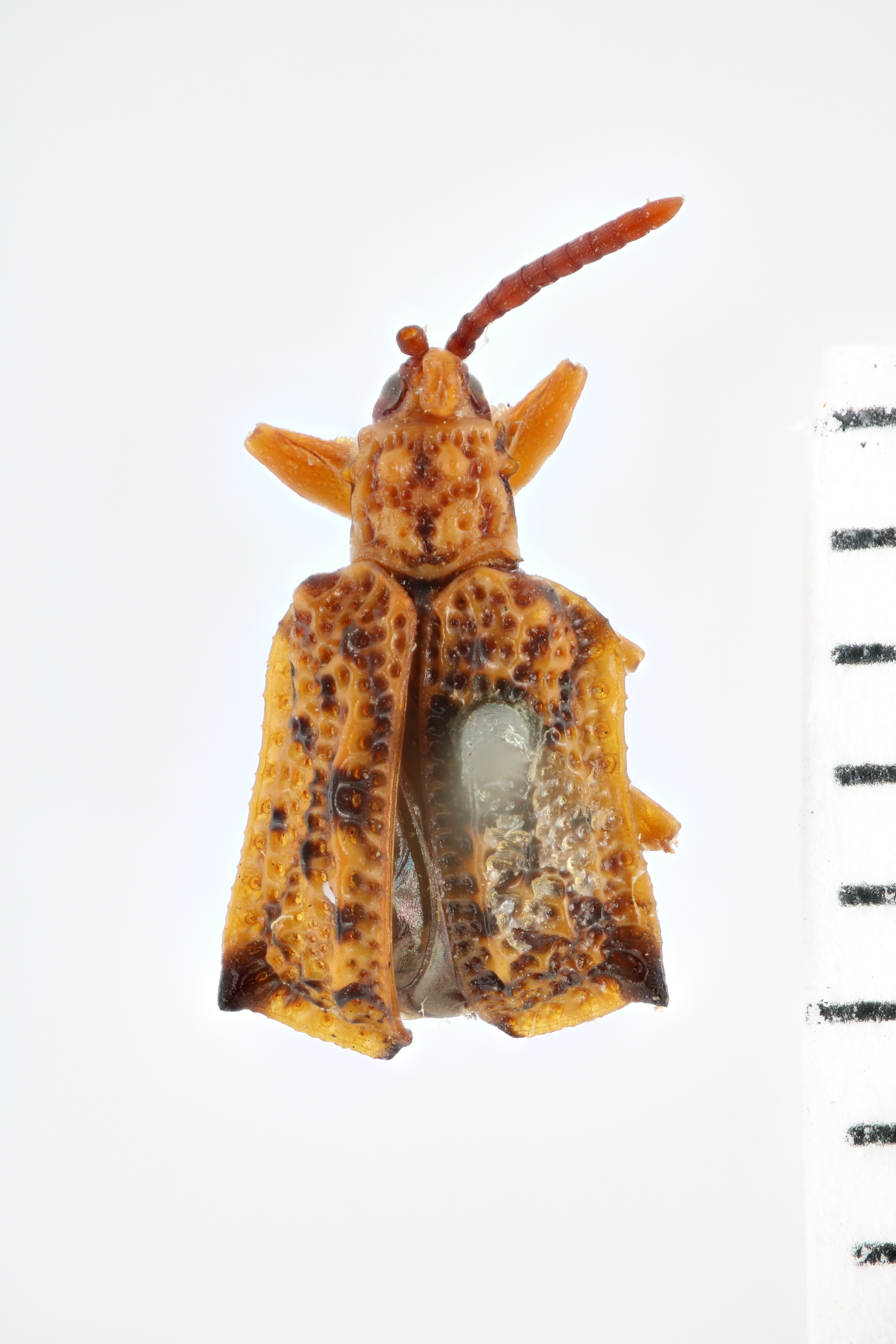

Scientific classification
- Kingdom: Animalia
- Phylum: Arthropoda
- Class: Insecta
- Order: Coleoptera
- Suborder: Polyphaga
- Infraorder: Cucujiformia
- Family: Chrysomelidae
- Genus: Oncocephala
- Species: O. depressa

Binomial name
- Oncocephala depressa Maulik, 1919

= Oncocephala depressa =

Species of beetle

Oncocephala depressa is a species of beetle of the family Chrysomelidae. It is found in India (Andhra Pradesh).

== Life history ==
No host plant has been documented for this species.
