= Hummingbird bush =

Hummingbird bush is a common name that may refer to several flowering plants associated with hummingbirds, including:

- Anisacanthus quadrifidus, a species in the family Acanthaceae native to Mexico and Texas, United States
- Grevillea thelemanniana, a species in the family Proteaceae endemic to Perth, Australia
- Hamelia patens, a species in the family Rubiaceae native to Central and South America
- Justicia californica, a species in the family Acanthaceae native to the south-western United States

== See also ==
- Ornithophily
- Hummingbird flower
- Hummingbird vine
