= Prionispa tuberculata =

Scientific classification
- Kingdom: Animalia
- Phylum: Arthropoda
- Class: Insecta
- Order: Coleoptera
- Suborder: Polyphaga
- Infraorder: Cucujiformia
- Family: Chrysomelidae
- Genus: Prionispa
- Species: P. tuberculata

Binomial name
- Prionispa tuberculata Pic, 1926

Species of beetle

Prionispa tuberculata is a species of beetle of the family Chrysomelidae. It is found in Thailand and Vietnam.

== Life history ==
The recorded host plant for this species is Ipomoea batatas.
