= Oncocephala wilmalegaspiae =

Scientific classification
- Kingdom: Animalia
- Phylum: Arthropoda
- Class: Insecta
- Order: Coleoptera
- Suborder: Polyphaga
- Infraorder: Cucujiformia
- Family: Chrysomelidae
- Genus: Oncocephala
- Species: O. wilmalegaspiae

Binomial name
- Oncocephala wilmalegaspiae Calcetas, Adorada & Staines, 2020

Species of beetle

Oncocephala wilmalegaspiae is a species of beetle of the family Chrysomelidae. It is found in Togo and Liberia.

== Description ==
Adults reach a length of about 5–6.1 mm. The head, pronotum, elytra and legs are dark brown with a black tinge and the explanate margin of the elytra is yellow. The antennae are black.

== Life history ==
No host plant has been documented for this species.
