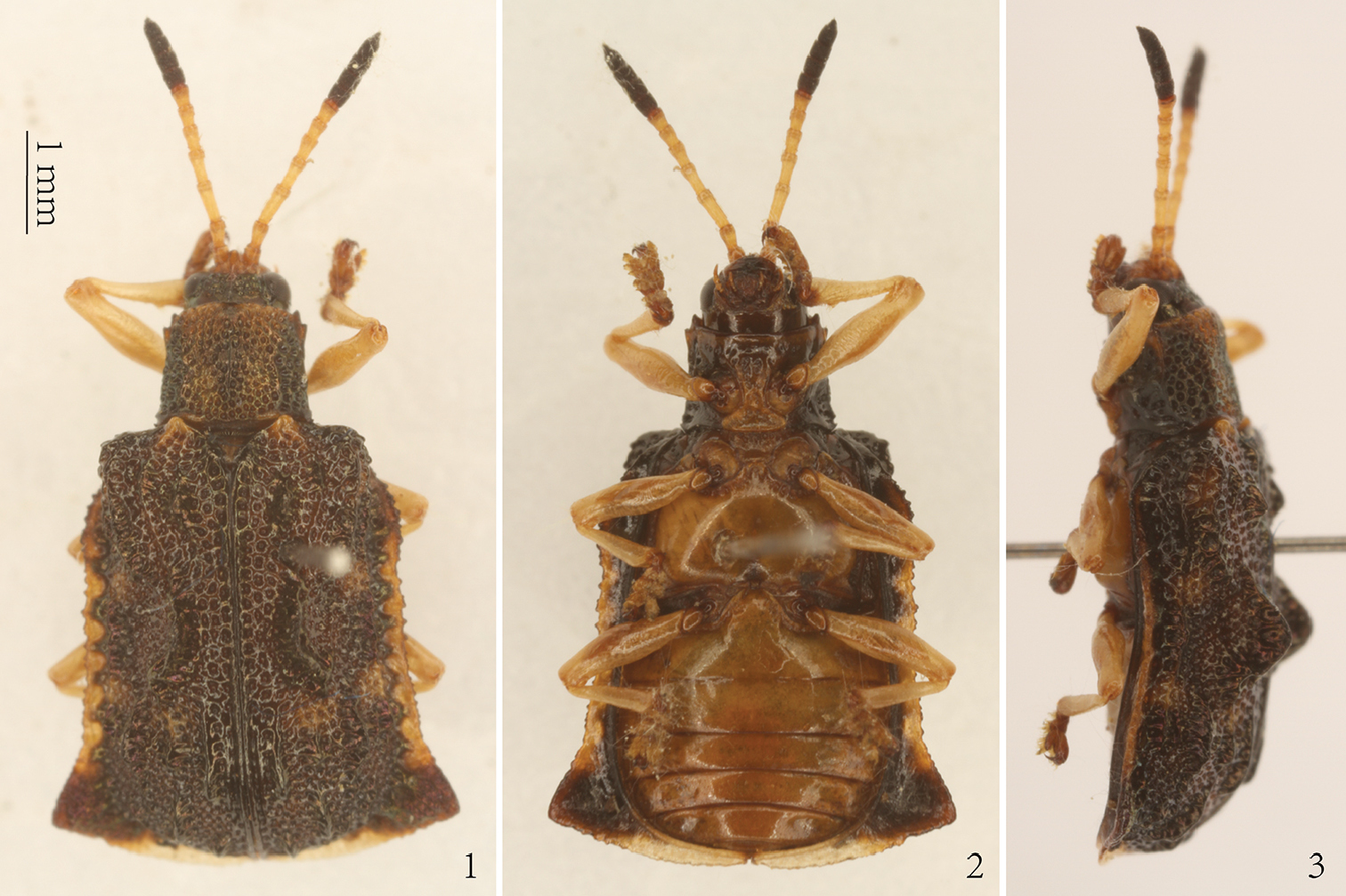

Scientific classification
- Kingdom: Animalia
- Phylum: Arthropoda
- Class: Insecta
- Order: Coleoptera
- Suborder: Polyphaga
- Infraorder: Cucujiformia
- Family: Chrysomelidae
- Genus: Prionispa
- Species: P. champaka

Binomial name
- Prionispa champaka Maulik, 1919

= Prionispa champaka =

Species of beetle

Prionispa champaka is a species of beetle of the family Chrysomelidae. It is found in China (Yunnan, Jiangxi), India (Assam) and Thailand.

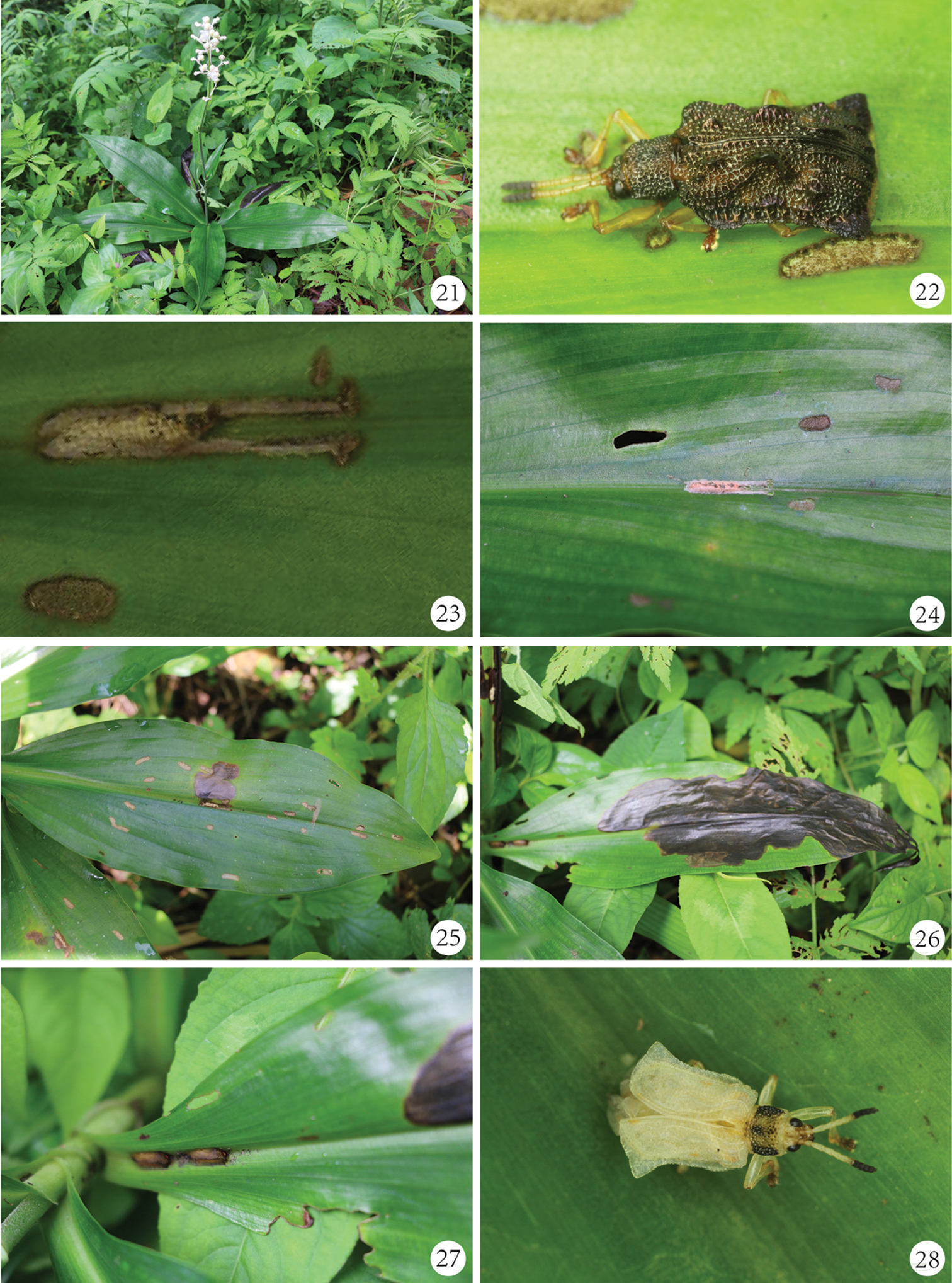
Life stages of Prionispa champaka. 21 Pollia japonica, the host plant for P. champaka 22 Adult of P. champaka and its feeding channel 23-24 An egg sheath of P. champaka which laid and located on the mid-rib of upper surface of a leaf 25 A leaf with new mine of hatching larvae of P. champaka and some linear feeding channels of adults 26 Large larval mine of mature larvae 27 Two pupal mines of P. champaka located at the base of petiole on the upper surface 28 Freshly emerged adult.

== Description ==
Larvae
Mature larvae reach a length of about 6.5–6.6 mm (without head). They have a yellowish body, with a dark brown head, brown spiracles. The pronotum has two irregular brown patches basally and a pale longitudinal line, as well as a brown trapezoidal patch on the prosternum. The legs are brown with dark brown claws.

Pupae
The length of the pupae is about 6.5 mm. The body is flattened dorso-ventrally, elongate-oval. The colour is yellowish-brown.

Adults
Freshly emerged adults are mostly white, with the eyes and apical four antennomeres black, and the pronotum yellowish with three black longitudinal marks or completely black, and brownish tarsi. Hours later, the body of the adults becomes darker and harder.

== Life history ==
The recorded host plants for this species include Zingiberaceae species, Pollia japonica and Pollia siamensis.

The life cycle of P. champaka is presumed to be univoltine.

Females have been observed biting a narrow line across the mid-rib of the lower canopy leaves of their host plant, and then extends it along each side of the mid-rib in the same direction. The biting channel results in two short vertical lines and forms an elongate 'U' shape. Subsequently, the female lays a single long egg sheath (usually comprising 5–8 eggs) at the base of the biting channel. Finally, the female covers this portion of the biting channel with feces. Freshly hatched larvae bore into the mesophyll of the upper leaf surface.

The larval mine is very broad and irregular in shape, even extending to the entire leaf. The larvae deposit their feces in the mine. The mature larva leaves its original mine and builds a new one on the base of petiole, in which it transforms into the pupa and then emerges as an adult. The pupal mine is an elongate channel with a distinct opening which closed by apex of pupal abdomen.

The feeding channels of the adults are elongate-oval or linear striped, usually on the upper surface of leaves.
