= Prionispa tenuicornis =

Scientific classification
- Kingdom: Animalia
- Phylum: Arthropoda
- Class: Insecta
- Order: Coleoptera
- Suborder: Polyphaga
- Infraorder: Cucujiformia
- Family: Chrysomelidae
- Genus: Prionispa
- Species: P. tenuicornis

Binomial name
- Prionispa tenuicornis Chapuis, 1875

Species of beetle

Prionispa tenuicornis is a species of beetle of the family Chrysomelidae. It is found in Bangladesh and India (Assam).

== Life history ==
No host plant has been documented for this species.
