= Prionispa papuana =

Scientific classification
- Kingdom: Animalia
- Phylum: Arthropoda
- Clade: Pancrustacea
- Class: Insecta
- Order: Coleoptera
- Suborder: Polyphaga
- Infraorder: Cucujiformia
- Family: Chrysomelidae
- Genus: Prionispa
- Species: P. papuana

Binomial name
- Prionispa papuana Gressitt, 1963

Species of beetle

Prionispa papuana is a species of beetle of the family Chrysomelidae. It is found in north-western New Guinea.

== Description ==
Adults reach a length of about 6.9 mm. They are pale ochraceous, faintly marked with pitchy green along middle of disc and along the middle of the side of the pronotum. The borders and ridges of the elytra are very faintly tinged with greenish.

== Life history ==
No host plant has been documented for this species.
