= Oncocephala angulata =

Scientific classification
- Kingdom: Animalia
- Phylum: Arthropoda
- Clade: Pancrustacea
- Class: Insecta
- Order: Coleoptera
- Suborder: Polyphaga
- Infraorder: Cucujiformia
- Family: Chrysomelidae
- Genus: Oncocephala
- Species: O. angulata

Binomial name
- Oncocephala angulata Gestro, 1885

Synonyms
- Oncocephala weisei Gestro, 1901; Oncocephala jeanvoinei Pic, 1935; Oncocephala weisei yunnanica Chen and Yu, 1962

Species of beetle

Oncocephala angulata is a species of beetle of the family Chrysomelidae. It is found in China (Yunnan), India (Andhra Pradesh, Punjab), Indonesia (Java, Sumatra), Malaysia, Myanmar, the Philippines (Luzon, Mindanao, Mindoro), Sri Lanka, Thailand and Vietnam.

== Description ==
Adults reach a length of about 4.2–4.3 mm. The head, pronotum and elytra are dark to pale brown with a black tinge, while the legs are pale brown. The antennae are dark brown with antennomeres 1, 10, and 11 paler than the rest.

== Life history ==
The recorded host plants for this species are orchids (Orchidaceae), Solanum melongena, Ipomoea species, yam (Dioscoreaceae) and ginger species (Zingiberaceae).
