= Oncocephala eborai =

Scientific classification
- Kingdom: Animalia
- Phylum: Arthropoda
- Class: Insecta
- Order: Coleoptera
- Suborder: Polyphaga
- Infraorder: Cucujiformia
- Family: Chrysomelidae
- Genus: Oncocephala
- Species: O. eborai

Binomial name
- Oncocephala eborai Calcetas, Staines & Adorada, 2021

Species of beetle

Oncocephala eborai is a species of beetle of the family Chrysomelidae. It is found in Cameroon and Equatorial Guinea.

== Description ==
Adults reach a length of about 5.5 mm. The head and pronotum are dark brown with a blackish tinge, while the elytra are black with a dark brown tinge and the legs are dark brown.

== Life history ==
No host plant has been documented for this species.

== Etymology ==
The species is named after Dr. Reynaldo Ebora, executive director of the Philippine Council for Agriculture Aquatic and Natural Resources Research and Development (PCAARRD), Los Baños, Laguna.
