= Prionispa pulchra =

Scientific classification
- Kingdom: Animalia
- Phylum: Arthropoda
- Class: Insecta
- Order: Coleoptera
- Suborder: Polyphaga
- Infraorder: Cucujiformia
- Family: Chrysomelidae
- Genus: Prionispa
- Species: P. pulchra

Binomial name
- Prionispa pulchra Gorham, 1892

Species of beetle

Prionispa pulchra is a species of beetle of the family Chrysomelidae. It is found in Malaysia.

== Life history ==
No host plant has been documented for this species.
