= Prionispa heruka =

Scientific classification
- Kingdom: Animalia
- Phylum: Arthropoda
- Class: Insecta
- Order: Coleoptera
- Suborder: Polyphaga
- Infraorder: Cucujiformia
- Family: Chrysomelidae
- Genus: Prionispa
- Species: P. heruka

Binomial name
- Prionispa heruka Würmli, 1976

Species of beetle

Prionispa heruka is a species of beetle of the family Chrysomelidae. It is found in India (Assam).

== Life history ==
No host plant has been documented for this species.
