= Oncocephala senegalensis =

Scientific classification
- Kingdom: Animalia
- Phylum: Arthropoda
- Class: Insecta
- Order: Coleoptera
- Suborder: Polyphaga
- Infraorder: Cucujiformia
- Family: Chrysomelidae
- Genus: Oncocephala
- Species: O. senegalensis

Binomial name
- Oncocephala senegalensis Guérin-Méneville, 1844

Synonyms
- Nepius corrosus Thomson, 1857

Species of beetle

Oncocephala senegalensis is a species of beetle of the family Chrysomelidae. It is found in Angola, Cameroon, Congo, Equatorial Guinea, Ethiopia, Gabon, Guinea-Bissau, Guinea, Nigeria, Ivory Coast, Togo, Senegal, Sierra Leone and Somalia.

== Description ==
Adults reach a length of about 4.8–5.8 mm. The head, pronotum, elytra, legs and antennae are black with a dark brownish tinge.

== Life history ==
The recorded host plant for this species is Ipomoea batatas.
