= Oncocephala atripennis =

Scientific classification
- Kingdom: Animalia
- Phylum: Arthropoda
- Class: Insecta
- Order: Coleoptera
- Suborder: Polyphaga
- Infraorder: Cucujiformia
- Family: Chrysomelidae
- Genus: Oncocephala
- Species: O. atripennis

Binomial name
- Oncocephala atripennis Pic, 1935

Species of beetle

Oncocephala atripennis is a species of beetle of the family Chrysomelidae. It is found in Indonesia (Borneo) and Malaysia.

== Life history ==
No host plant has been documented for this species.
