= Oncocephala sulawesia =

Scientific classification
- Kingdom: Animalia
- Phylum: Arthropoda
- Clade: Pancrustacea
- Class: Insecta
- Order: Coleoptera
- Suborder: Polyphaga
- Infraorder: Cucujiformia
- Family: Chrysomelidae
- Genus: Oncocephala
- Species: O. sulawesia

Binomial name
- Oncocephala sulawesia Gressitt, 1957

Species of beetle

Oncocephala sulawesia is a species of beetle of the family Chrysomelidae. It is found in Indonesia (Sulawesi) and New Guinea.

== Life history ==
No host plant has been documented for this species.
