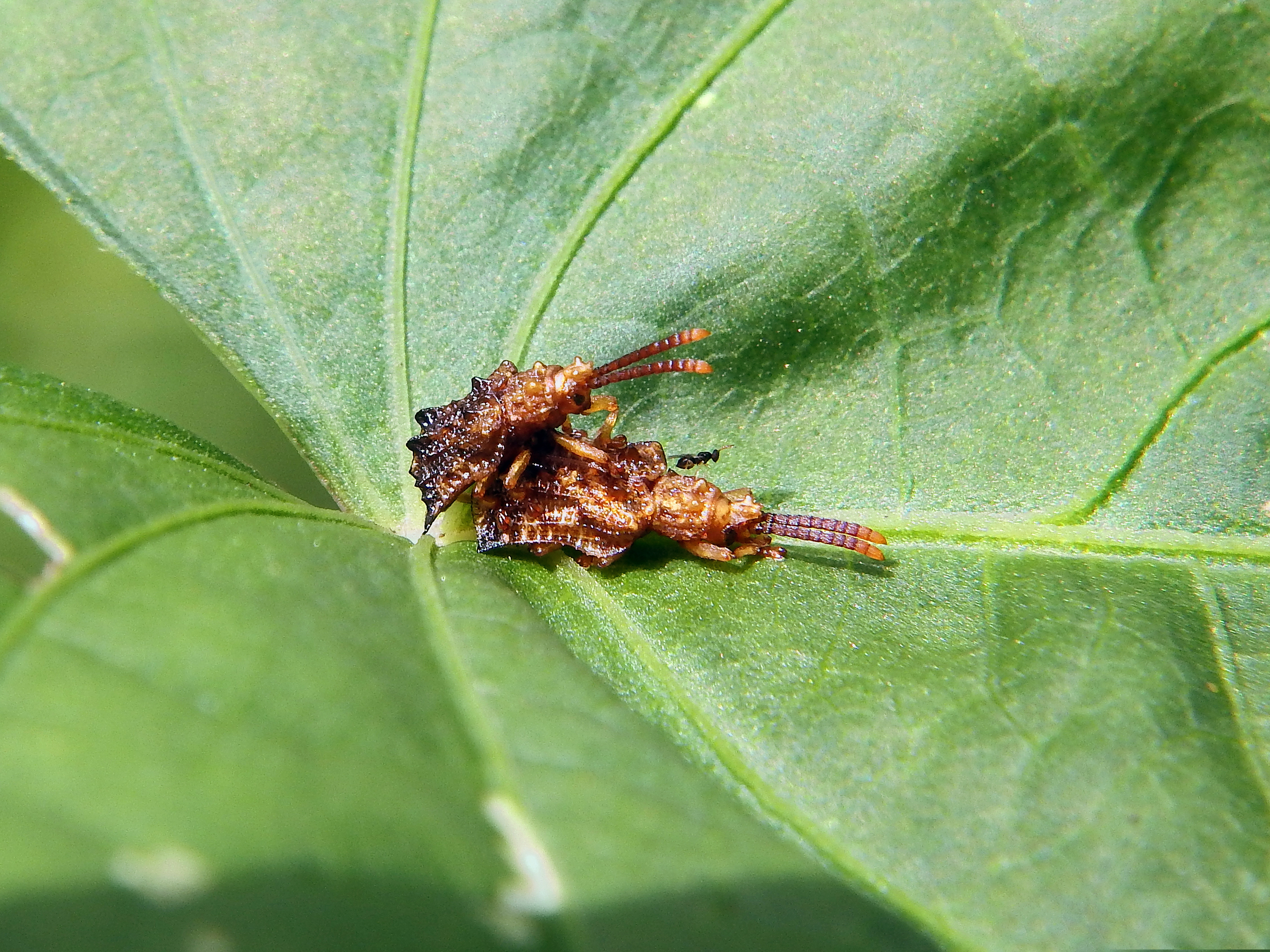
- Oncocephala sp. male and female

Scientific classification
- Kingdom: Animalia
- Phylum: Arthropoda
- Clade: Pancrustacea
- Class: Insecta
- Order: Coleoptera
- Suborder: Polyphaga
- Infraorder: Cucujiformia
- Family: Chrysomelidae
- Subfamily: Cassidinae
- Tribe: Oncocephalini
- Genus: Oncocephala; Agassiz, 1846 (Guérin-Méneville, 1844)

Synonyms
- Onchocephala Chevrolat, 1836; Nepius Thomson, 1858

= Oncocephala =

Genus of beetles

Oncocephala is a genus of Asian and African leaf beetles, typical of the tribe Oncocephalini in the subfamily Cassidinae; authorship is often assigned to Louis Agassiz, and is maintained by the ICZN, but should be attributed to Guérin-Méneville, 1844.

== Species ==
The Global Biodiversity Information Facility includes:

- Oncocephala acutangula Gestro, 1917
- Oncocephala angulata Gestro, 1885
- Oncocephala angusticollis Gestro, 1906
- Oncocephala atratangula Gressitt, 1938
- Oncocephala atripennis Pic, 1935
- Oncocephala basilewskyi Uhmann, 1954
- Oncocephala bicristata Chapuis, 1876
- Oncocephala bouvieri Gestro, 1899
- Oncocephala camachoi Calcetas, Staines & Adorada, 2021
- Oncocephala cuneata Gestro, 1906
- Oncocephala deleoni Calcetas, Staines & Adorada, 2021
- Oncocephala demesai Calcetas, Staines & Adorada, 2021
- Oncocephala depressa Maulik, 1919
- Oncocephala dimaculanganae Calcetas, Staines & Adorada, 2021
- Oncocephala dorsalis Weise, 1897
- Oncocephala eborai Calcetas, Staines & Adorada, 2021
- Oncocephala feae Gestro, 1899
- Oncocephala gestroi Weise, 1899
- Oncocephala grandis Chen & Yu, 1962
- Oncocephala hemicyclica Chen & Yu, 1962
- Oncocephala inchoans Uhmann, 1954
- Oncocephala incisa Pic, 1941
- Oncocephala insignis Gestro, 1899
- Oncocephala madoni Pic, 1941
- Oncocephala methneri Uhmann, 1928
- Oncocephala modiglianii Gestro, 1899
- Oncocephala montivaga Gestro, 1914
- Oncocephala nadeini Calcetas, Adorada & Staines, 2020
- Oncocephala nervosa Weise, 1902
- Oncocephala perrieri Fairmaire, 1899
- Oncocephala philippinica Uhmann, 1937
- Oncocephala polilloana Uhmann, 1931
- Oncocephala promontorii Péringuey, 1898
- Oncocephala proxima Gestro, 1899
- Oncocephala quadrilobata Guérin-Méneville, 1844
- Oncocephala ruficornis Pic, 1941
- Oncocephala senegalensis Guérin-Méneville, 1844
- Oncocephala severinii Gestro, 1899
- Oncocephala siamensis Gestro, 1899
- Oncocephala sulawesia Gressitt, 1957
- Oncocephala susanstainesae Calcetas, Staines & Adorada, 2021
- Oncocephala tenax Weise, 1897
- Oncocephala tuberculata (Olivier, 1792)
- Oncocephala wilmalegaspiae Calcetas, Adorada & Staines, 2020

== Selected former species ==
- Oncocephala kolbei Gestro, 1899
- Oncocephala scabrosa Gestro, 1906
