= Chaeridiona thailandica =

Scientific classification
- Kingdom: Animalia
- Phylum: Arthropoda
- Class: Insecta
- Order: Coleoptera
- Suborder: Polyphaga
- Infraorder: Cucujiformia
- Family: Chrysomelidae
- Genus: Chaeridiona
- Species: C. thailandica

Binomial name
- Chaeridiona thailandica Kimoto, 1998

Species of beetle

Chaeridiona thailandica is a species of beetle of the family Chrysomelidae. It is found in Thailand.

== Description ==
Adults reach a length of about 3.8–4.4 mm. The pronotal and elytral discs are metallic green, while the head and pronotum are coppery laterally and the elytra are yellowish laterally and apically. The antennae and legs are yellowish.

== Life history ==
The recorded host plants for this species are Boesenbergia rotunda and Zingiber species.
