= Prionispa cheni =

Scientific classification
- Kingdom: Animalia
- Phylum: Arthropoda
- Class: Insecta
- Order: Coleoptera
- Suborder: Polyphaga
- Infraorder: Cucujiformia
- Family: Chrysomelidae
- Genus: Prionispa
- Species: P. cheni

Binomial name
- Prionispa cheni Staines, 2007

Synonyms
- Chaeridiona tuberculata Chen & Yu, 1964 (preocc.)

Species of beetle

Prionispa cheni is a species of beetle of the family Chrysomelidae. It is found in China (Yunnan).

== Life history ==
No host plant has been documented for this species.
