= Oncocephala montivaga =

Scientific classification
- Kingdom: Animalia
- Phylum: Arthropoda
- Class: Insecta
- Order: Coleoptera
- Suborder: Polyphaga
- Infraorder: Cucujiformia
- Family: Chrysomelidae
- Genus: Oncocephala
- Species: O. montivaga

Binomial name
- Oncocephala montivaga Gestro, 1914

Species of beetle

Oncocephala montivaga is a species of beetle of the family Chrysomelidae. It is found in Senegal, Guinea, Liberia, Togo, Kenya and Zimbabwe.

== Description ==
Adults reach a length of about 4.9–5.7 mm. The head, pronotum, elytra and legs are light brownish with a black tinge, while the antennae are dark brownish.

== Life history ==
No host plant has been documented for this species.
