= Prionispa dentata =

Scientific classification
- Kingdom: Animalia
- Phylum: Arthropoda
- Class: Insecta
- Order: Coleoptera
- Suborder: Polyphaga
- Infraorder: Cucujiformia
- Family: Chrysomelidae
- Genus: Prionispa
- Species: P. dentata

Binomial name
- Prionispa dentata Pic, 1938

Species of beetle

Prionispa dentata is a species of beetle of the family Chrysomelidae. It is found in China (Yunnan), Thailand and Vietnam.

== Life history ==
The recorded host plants for this species are Zingiberaceae and Commelinaceae species.
