= Oncocephala siamensis =

Scientific classification
- Kingdom: Animalia
- Phylum: Arthropoda
- Class: Insecta
- Order: Coleoptera
- Suborder: Polyphaga
- Infraorder: Cucujiformia
- Family: Chrysomelidae
- Genus: Oncocephala
- Species: O. siamensis

Binomial name
- Oncocephala siamensis Gestro, 1899

Synonyms
- Oncocephala donckieri Pic, 1935

Species of beetle

Oncocephala siamensis is a species of beetle of the family Chrysomelidae. It is found in Laos, Thailand and Vietnam.

== Life history ==
The recorded host plant for this species is Ipomoea pes-caprae.
