= Chaeridiona =

Scientific classification
- Kingdom: Animalia
- Phylum: Arthropoda
- Class: Insecta
- Order: Coleoptera
- Suborder: Polyphaga
- Infraorder: Cucujiformia
- Family: Chrysomelidae
- Subfamily: Cassidinae
- Tribe: Oncocephalini
- Genus: Chaeridiona; Baly, 1869

Synonyms
- Choeridiona Gemminger & Harold, 1876

Genus of leaf beetles

Chaeridiona is a genus of Asian leaf beetles belonging to the tribe Oncocephalini.

== Species ==
- Chaeridiona angulata Staines, 2007
- Chaeridiona cupreovirida Gressitt, 1950
- Chaeridiona feae Gestro, 1890
- Chaeridiona mayuri Shameem & Prathapan, 2014
- Chaeridiona metallica Baly, 1869
- Chaeridiona picea Baly, 1869
- Chaeridiona pseudometallica Basu, 1999
- Chaeridiona semiviridis Pic, 1935
- Chaeridiona thailandica Kimoto, 1998
- Chaeridiona tuberculata Uhmann, 1961
