= Oncocephala nervosa =

Scientific classification
- Kingdom: Animalia
- Phylum: Arthropoda
- Class: Insecta
- Order: Coleoptera
- Suborder: Polyphaga
- Infraorder: Cucujiformia
- Family: Chrysomelidae
- Genus: Oncocephala
- Species: O. nervosa

Binomial name
- Oncocephala nervosa Weise, 1902

Species of beetle

Oncocephala nervosa is a species of beetle of the family Chrysomelidae. It is found in Cameroon, Tanzania and Uganda.

== Description ==
Adults reach a length of about 4.8–5.5 mm. The head, pronotum and elytra are charcoal black, with a light brownish tinge on the explanate areas of the elytra. The legs and antennae are light brownish with a black tinge on some areas.

== Life history ==
No host plant has been documented for this species.
