= Oncocephala bicristata =

Scientific classification
- Kingdom: Animalia
- Phylum: Arthropoda
- Clade: Pancrustacea
- Class: Insecta
- Order: Coleoptera
- Suborder: Polyphaga
- Infraorder: Cucujiformia
- Family: Chrysomelidae
- Genus: Oncocephala
- Species: O. bicristata

Binomial name
- Oncocephala bicristata Chapuis, 1876

Species of beetle

Oncocephala bicristata is a species of beetle of the family Chrysomelidae. It is found in Indonesia (Sulawesi) and the Philippines (Leyte, Luzon, Mindanao, Mindoro).

== Description ==
Adults reach a length of about 4.8–5.5 mm. The head, pronotum and elytra are brown with a black tinge, while the legs are brown and the antennae are dark brown.

== Life history ==
No host plant has been documented for this species.
