= Prionispa fulvicollis =

Scientific classification
- Kingdom: Animalia
- Phylum: Arthropoda
- Clade: Pancrustacea
- Class: Insecta
- Order: Coleoptera
- Suborder: Polyphaga
- Infraorder: Cucujiformia
- Family: Chrysomelidae
- Genus: Prionispa
- Species: P. fulvicollis

Binomial name
- Prionispa fulvicollis (Guérin-Méneville, 1830)

Synonyms
- Hispa fulvicollis Guérin-Méneville, 1830; Prionispa nitida Chapuis, 1875

Species of beetle

Prionispa fulvicollis is a species of beetle of the family Chrysomelidae. It is found in Indonesia (Java, Sumatra).

== Life history ==
The recorded host plant for this species is Pollia thyrsiflora.
