= Chaeridiona tuberculata =

Scientific classification
- Kingdom: Animalia
- Phylum: Arthropoda
- Class: Insecta
- Order: Coleoptera
- Suborder: Polyphaga
- Infraorder: Cucujiformia
- Family: Chrysomelidae
- Genus: Chaeridiona
- Species: C. tuberculata

Binomial name
- Chaeridiona tuberculata Uhmann, 1961

Species of beetle

Chaeridiona tuberculata is a species of beetle of the family Chrysomelidae. It is found in India (Tamil Nadu).

== Description ==
Adults reach a length of about 4.5–5.9 mm. The dorsum is dull dark brown without a metallic sheen. There are black tubercles and irregular patches on the elytra.

== Life history ==
No host plant has been documented for this species.
