= Oncocephala bouvieri =

Scientific classification
- Kingdom: Animalia
- Phylum: Arthropoda
- Class: Insecta
- Order: Coleoptera
- Suborder: Polyphaga
- Infraorder: Cucujiformia
- Family: Chrysomelidae
- Genus: Oncocephala
- Species: O. bouvieri

Binomial name
- Oncocephala bouvieri Gestro, 1899

Species of beetle

Oncocephala bouvieri is a species of beetle of the family Chrysomelidae. It is found in Madagascar.

== Description ==
Adults reach a length of about 3.7 mm. The head, pronotum, elytra and legs are dark brownish with a black tinge, while the antennae are light brownish medially and dark brownish apically.

== Life history ==
No host plant has been documented for this species.
