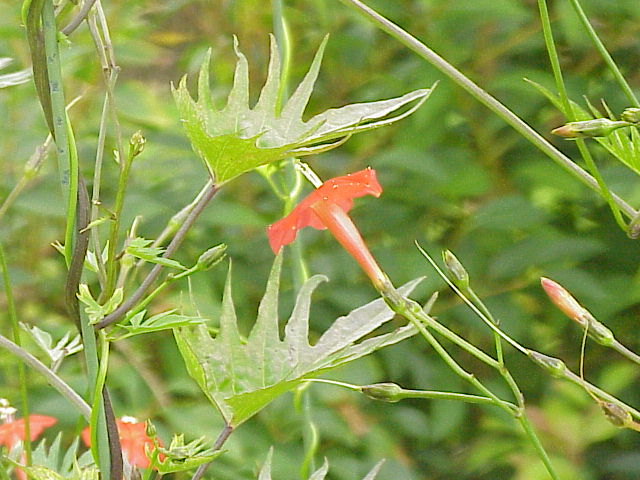

Scientific classification
- Kingdom: Plantae
- Clade: Tracheophytes
- Clade: Angiosperms
- Clade: Eudicots
- Clade: Asterids
- Order: Solanales
- Family: Convolvulaceae
- Genus: Ipomoea
- Species: I. × multifida

Binomial name
- Ipomoea × multifida (Raf.) Shinners

= Ipomoea × multifida =

Species of flowering plant

Ipomea × multifida is a hybridogenic species. Its ancestors are I. coccinea and I. quamoclit (the cypress vine).

Its allotetraploid is Ipomoea sloteri. Both are known as cardinal climber.
