= Oncocephala madoni =

Scientific classification
- Kingdom: Animalia
- Phylum: Arthropoda
- Class: Insecta
- Order: Coleoptera
- Suborder: Polyphaga
- Infraorder: Cucujiformia
- Family: Chrysomelidae
- Genus: Oncocephala
- Species: O. madoni

Binomial name
- Oncocephala madoni Pic, 1941

Species of beetle

Oncocephala madoni is a species of beetle of the family Chrysomelidae. It is found in Gabon.

== Description ==
Adults reach a length of about 6 mm. They are oblong, subcuneiform and black marked with some red.

== Life history ==
No host plant has been documented for this species.
