= Oncocephala camachoi =

Scientific classification
- Kingdom: Animalia
- Phylum: Arthropoda
- Class: Insecta
- Order: Coleoptera
- Suborder: Polyphaga
- Infraorder: Cucujiformia
- Family: Chrysomelidae
- Genus: Oncocephala
- Species: O. camachoi

Binomial name
- Oncocephala camachoi Calcetas, Staines & Adorada, 2021

Species of beetle

Oncocephala camachoi is a species of beetle of the family Chrysomelidae. It is found in Cameroon.

== Description ==
Adults reach a length of about 5.5 mm. The head and pronotum are dark brown with a blackish tinge, while the elytra are black with a dark brown tinge. The legs are dark brown.

== Life history ==
No host plant has been documented for this species.

== Etymology ==
The species is named after the 10th Chancellor of the University of the Philippines Los Baños Dr. Jose V. Camacho Jr.
