= Oncocephala susanstainesae =

Scientific classification
- Kingdom: Animalia
- Phylum: Arthropoda
- Class: Insecta
- Order: Coleoptera
- Suborder: Polyphaga
- Infraorder: Cucujiformia
- Family: Chrysomelidae
- Genus: Oncocephala
- Species: O. susanstainesae

Binomial name
- Oncocephala susanstainesae Calcetas, Staines & Adorada, 2021

Species of beetle

Oncocephala susanstainesae is a species of beetle of the family Chrysomelidae. It is found in Namibia.

== Description ==
Adults reach a length of about 4.2–5.5 mm. The head and pronotum are light to dark brown with a blackish tinge, or sometimes blackish with a dark brown tinge. The elytra range from yellowish with a blackish tinge to dark yellow with a dark brown tinge. The legs range from dark yellow to dark brown.

== Life history ==
No host plant has been documented for this species.

== Etymology ==
The species is named after Susan L. Staines, Visiting Scientist, Smithsonian Environmental Research Center, Edgewater, Maryland, USA.
