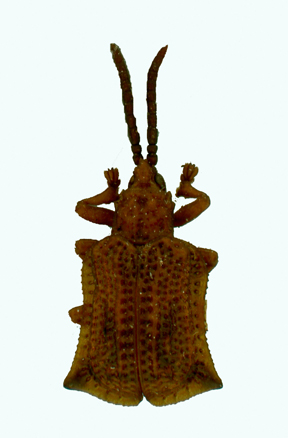

Scientific classification
- Kingdom: Animalia
- Phylum: Arthropoda
- Class: Insecta
- Order: Coleoptera
- Suborder: Polyphaga
- Infraorder: Cucujiformia
- Family: Chrysomelidae
- Genus: Oncocephala
- Species: O. philippinica

Binomial name
- Oncocephala philippinica Uhmann, 1937

= Oncocephala philippinica =

Species of beetle

Oncocephala philippinica is a species of beetle of the family Chrysomelidae. It is found in the Philippines (Luzon, Mindanao, Mindoro).

== Description ==
Adults reach a length of about 4.2–5 mm. The head, pronotum, elytra and legs are brown with a black tinge. The antennae are dark brown, but with antennomeres 10 and 11 paler than the rest.

== Life history ==
No host plant has been documented for this species.
