= Oncocephala demesai =

Scientific classification
- Kingdom: Animalia
- Phylum: Arthropoda
- Class: Insecta
- Order: Coleoptera
- Suborder: Polyphaga
- Infraorder: Cucujiformia
- Family: Chrysomelidae
- Genus: Oncocephala
- Species: O. demesai

Binomial name
- Oncocephala demesai Calcetas, Staines & Adorada, 2021

Species of beetle

Oncocephala demesai is a species of beetle of the family Chrysomelidae. It is found in Togo.

== Description ==
Adults reach a length of about 5 mm. The head, pronotum and elytra are black with a dark brownish tinge, while the legs are dark brown and the antennae are mostly charcoal black.

== Life history ==
No host plant has been documented for this species.

== Etymology ==
The species is named after the Department of Agriculture Assistant Secretary for Operations Engr. Arnel V. De Mesa.
