= Oncocephala cuneata =

Scientific classification
- Kingdom: Animalia
- Phylum: Arthropoda
- Class: Insecta
- Order: Coleoptera
- Suborder: Polyphaga
- Infraorder: Cucujiformia
- Family: Chrysomelidae
- Genus: Oncocephala
- Species: O. cuneata

Binomial name
- Oncocephala cuneata Gestro, 1906

Species of beetle

Oncocephala cuneata is a species of beetle of the family Chrysomelidae. It is found in Liberia, Cameroon, Equatorial Guinea and the Democratic Republic of the Congo.

== Description ==
Adults reach a length of about 4.4–5 mm. The head, pronotum and elytra are black, while the legs and antennae are dark brownish with black.

== Life history ==
No host plant has been documented for this species.
