= Chaeridiona pseudometallica =

Scientific classification
- Kingdom: Animalia
- Phylum: Arthropoda
- Class: Insecta
- Order: Coleoptera
- Suborder: Polyphaga
- Infraorder: Cucujiformia
- Family: Chrysomelidae
- Genus: Chaeridiona
- Species: C. pseudometallica

Binomial name
- Chaeridiona pseudometallica Basu, 1999

Species of beetle

Chaeridiona pseudometallica is a species of beetle of the family Chrysomelidae. It is found in India (West Bengal).

== Description ==
Adults reach a length of about 3.2 mm. The pronotum and elytra are metallic green medially and purplish-red laterally and apically. The extreme apex and the legs however, are yellowish-brown.

== Life history ==
Adults have been collected on an unidentified Zingiberaceae species.
