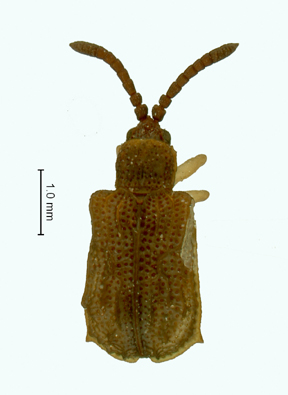

Scientific classification
- Kingdom: Animalia
- Phylum: Arthropoda
- Class: Insecta
- Order: Coleoptera
- Suborder: Polyphaga
- Infraorder: Cucujiformia
- Family: Chrysomelidae
- Genus: Prionispa
- Species: P. crassicornis

Binomial name
- Prionispa crassicornis Gestro, 1909

= Prionispa crassicornis =

Species of beetle

Prionispa crassicornis is a species of beetle of the family Chrysomelidae. It is found in India (Andhra Pradesh).

== Life history ==
No host plant has been documented for this species.
