= Oncocephala incisa =

Scientific classification
- Kingdom: Animalia
- Phylum: Arthropoda
- Class: Insecta
- Order: Coleoptera
- Suborder: Polyphaga
- Infraorder: Cucujiformia
- Family: Chrysomelidae
- Genus: Oncocephala
- Species: O. incisa

Binomial name
- Oncocephala incisa Pic, 1941

Species of beetle

Oncocephala incisa is a species of beetle of the family Chrysomelidae. It is found in Madagascar.

== Description ==
Adults reach a length of about 4.2 mm. The head, pronotum, elytra and legs are black with a brownish to orange tinge, while the antennae are entirely black.

== Life history ==
No host plant has been documented for this species.
