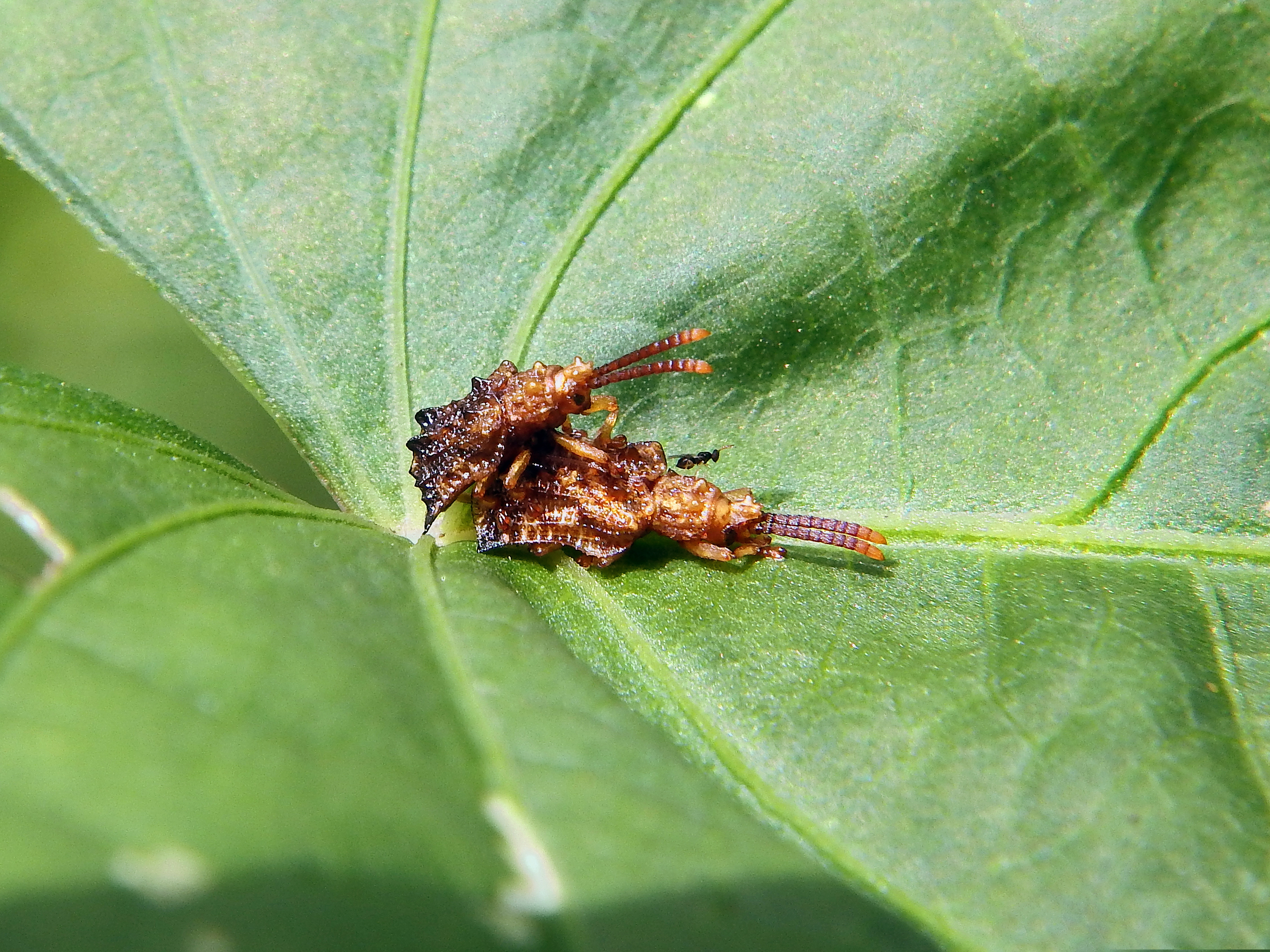
- Oncocephala sp.

Scientific classification
- Kingdom: Animalia
- Phylum: Arthropoda
- Class: Insecta
- Order: Coleoptera
- Suborder: Polyphaga
- Infraorder: Cucujiformia
- Family: Chrysomelidae
- Subfamily: Cassidinae
- Tribe: Oncocephalini; Chapuis, 1875

Genera
- see text

Synonyms
- Choeridionini Weise, 1911

= Oncocephalini =

Tribe of leaf beetles

Oncocephalini is a tribe of leaf beetles within the subfamily Cassidinae. Records of occurrence are mostly from Asia, although some species of the type genus Oncocephala are from Africa.

== Genera ==
- Chaeridiona Baly, 1869
- Oncocephala Agassiz, 1846
- Prionispa Chapuis, 1875
