= Oncocephala nadeini =

Scientific classification
- Kingdom: Animalia
- Phylum: Arthropoda
- Class: Insecta
- Order: Coleoptera
- Suborder: Polyphaga
- Infraorder: Cucujiformia
- Family: Chrysomelidae
- Genus: Oncocephala
- Species: O. nadeini

Binomial name
- Oncocephala nadeini Calcetas, Adorada & Staines, 2020

Species of beetle

Oncocephala nadeini is a species of beetle of the family Chrysomelidae. It is found in Sudan.

== Description ==
Adults reach a length of about 3.7 mm. The head, pronotum and elytra are black with a brownish tinge around the explanate margins of the elytra. The antennae are black, but brownish apically and the legs are light brown.

== Life history ==
No host plant has been documented for this species.
