= Oncocephala dorsalis =

Scientific classification
- Kingdom: Animalia
- Phylum: Arthropoda
- Class: Insecta
- Order: Coleoptera
- Suborder: Polyphaga
- Infraorder: Cucujiformia
- Family: Chrysomelidae
- Genus: Oncocephala
- Species: O. dorsalis

Binomial name
- Oncocephala dorsalis Weise, 1897

Species of beetle

Oncocephala dorsalis is a species of beetle of the family Chrysomelidae. It is found in India (Karnataka, Maharashtra).

== Life history ==
The recorded host plants for this species are Ipomoea species.
