= Oncocephala ruficornis =

Scientific classification
- Kingdom: Animalia
- Phylum: Arthropoda
- Class: Insecta
- Order: Coleoptera
- Suborder: Polyphaga
- Infraorder: Cucujiformia
- Family: Chrysomelidae
- Genus: Oncocephala
- Species: O. ruficornis

Binomial name
- Oncocephala ruficornis Pic, 1941

Species of beetle

Oncocephala ruficornis is a species of beetle of the family Chrysomelidae. It is found in Tanzania.

== Description ==
Adults reach a length of about 4.6 mm. The head, pronotum, elytra and legs are black with a light brownish tinge, while the antennae are light brownish.

== Life history ==
No host plant has been documented for this species.
