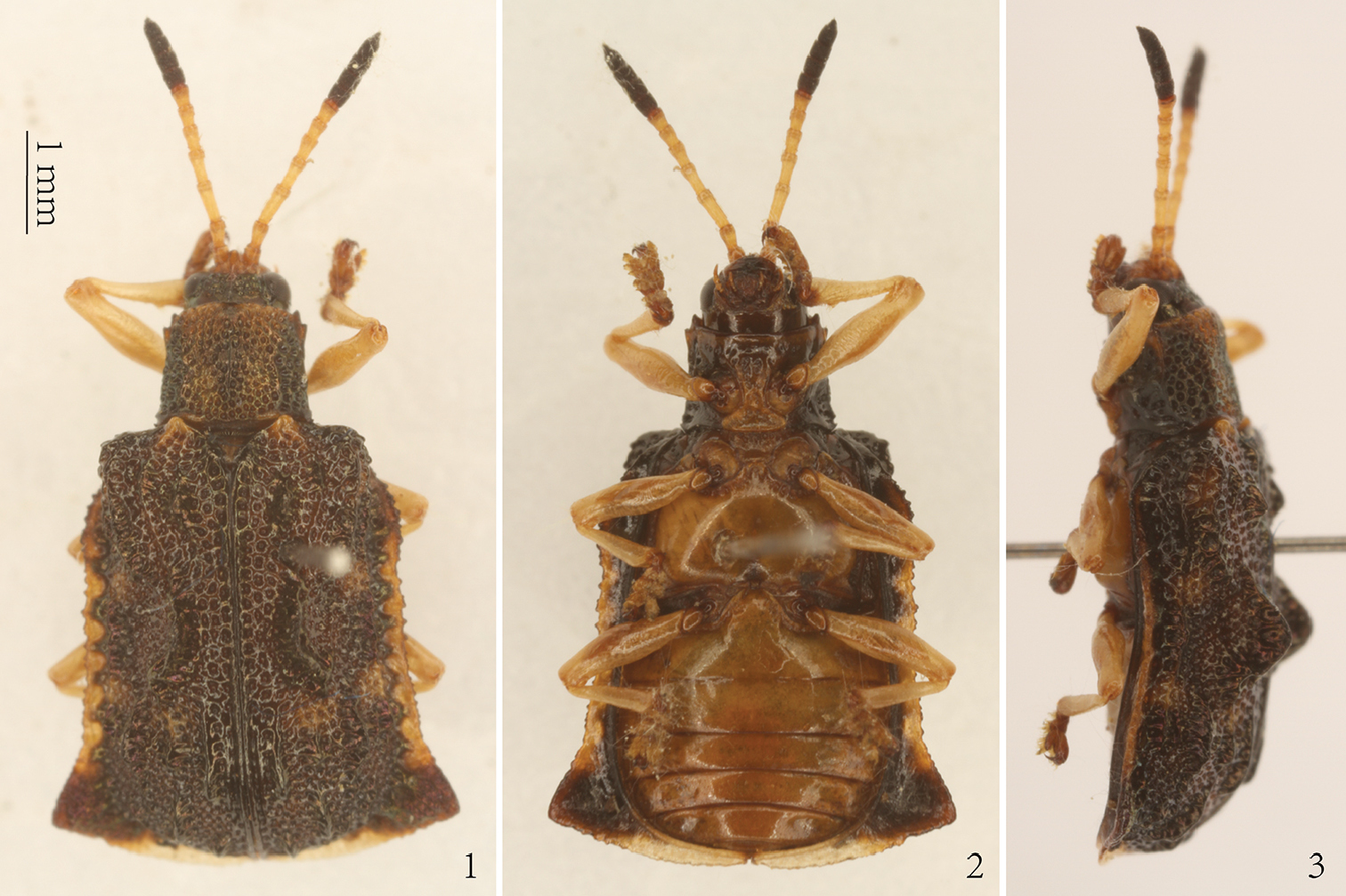
- Prionispa champaka

Scientific classification
- Kingdom: Animalia
- Phylum: Arthropoda
- Class: Insecta
- Order: Coleoptera
- Suborder: Polyphaga
- Infraorder: Cucujiformia
- Family: Chrysomelidae
- Subfamily: Cassidinae
- Tribe: Oncocephalini
- Genus: Prionispa; Chapuis, 1875

= Prionispa =

Genus of leaf beetles

Prionispa is a genus of Asian leaf beetles belonging to the tribe Oncocephalini.

== Species ==
- Prionispa bakeri Gestro, 1917
- Prionispa champaka Maulik, 1919
- Prionispa cheni Staines, 2007
- Prionispa clavata (Yu, 1992)
- Prionispa crassicornis Gestro, 1909
- Prionispa cuneata Uhmann, 1954
- Prionispa dentata Pic, 1938
- Prionispa distincta Gestro, 1897
- Prionispa fulva L. Medvedev, 1995
- Prionispa fulvicollis (Guérin-Méneville, 1830)
- Prionispa gemmata Baly, 1876
- Prionispa heruka Würmli, 1976
- Prionispa himalayensis Maulik, 1915
- Prionispa houjayi Lee et al., 2009
- Prionispa inermis Gestro, 1899b
- Prionispa laeta L. Medvedev, 1990
- Prionispa longicornis Gestro, 1906
- Prionispa lucida Gestro, 1917
- Prionispa mauliki Uhmann, 1930
- Prionispa opacipennis Chen & Yu, 1962
- Prionispa patra Maulik, 1919
- Prionispa pulchra Gorham, 1892
- Prionispa papuana Gressitt, 1963
- Prionispa sinica Gressitt, 1950
- Prionispa sonata Maulik, 1919
- Prionispa subopaca Chapuis, 1875
- Prionispa tenuicornis Gestro, 1909
- Prionispa tuberculata Pic, 1926
- Prionispa vethi Gestro, 1906
