= Oncocephala angusticollis =

Scientific classification
- Kingdom: Animalia
- Phylum: Arthropoda
- Class: Insecta
- Order: Coleoptera
- Suborder: Polyphaga
- Infraorder: Cucujiformia
- Family: Chrysomelidae
- Genus: Oncocephala
- Species: O. angusticollis

Binomial name
- Oncocephala angusticollis Gestro, 1906

Species of beetle

Oncocephala angusticollis is a species of beetle of the family Chrysomelidae. It is found in Ivory Coast, Cameroon, Guinea and Nigeria.

== Description ==
Adults reach a length of about 5.2 mm. The head, pronotum and elytra are black, while the antennae are dark brownish with a black tinge. The legs are light brownish.

== Life history ==
No host plant has been documented for this species.
