= Chaeridiona semiviridis =

Scientific classification
- Kingdom: Animalia
- Phylum: Arthropoda
- Class: Insecta
- Order: Coleoptera
- Suborder: Polyphaga
- Infraorder: Cucujiformia
- Family: Chrysomelidae
- Genus: Chaeridiona
- Species: C. semiviridis

Binomial name
- Chaeridiona semiviridis Pic, 1935

Species of beetle

Chaeridiona semiviridis is a species of beetle of the family Chrysomelidae. It is found in Thailand and Vietnam.

== Description ==
Adults reach a length of about 3.6–4.1 mm. The head, pronotum and elytra are yellowish-ochre with a medial metallic green spot. The legs are yellow and the antennae are reddish-yellow.

== Life history ==
Adults have been collected from an unidentified Zingiberaceae species and Costus species. Later findings identified Zingiber species as a host plant for this species.
