= Oncocephala quadrilobata =

Scientific classification
- Kingdom: Animalia
- Phylum: Arthropoda
- Class: Insecta
- Order: Coleoptera
- Suborder: Polyphaga
- Infraorder: Cucujiformia
- Family: Chrysomelidae
- Genus: Oncocephala
- Species: O. quadrilobata

Binomial name
- Oncocephala quadrilobata Guérin-Méneville, 1844

Species of beetle

Oncocephala quadrilobata is a species of beetle of the family Chrysomelidae. It is found in China (Guangxi, Yunnan), India (Andaman Islands, Andhra Pradesh, Maharashtra, Pashan Prune, Pondicherry, Tamil Nadu), Myanmar, Pakistan, Sri Lanka and Vietnam.

== Life history ==
The recorded host plants for this species are Ipomoea species, Argyreia nervosa and Rumex species.
