= Prionispa gemmata =

Scientific classification
- Kingdom: Animalia
- Phylum: Arthropoda
- Class: Insecta
- Order: Coleoptera
- Suborder: Polyphaga
- Infraorder: Cucujiformia
- Family: Chrysomelidae
- Genus: Prionispa
- Species: P. gemmata

Binomial name
- Prionispa gemmata Baly, 1876

Species of beetle

Prionispa gemmata is a species of beetle of the family Chrysomelidae. It is found on the Moluccas (Batjan Island).

== Life history ==
No host plant has been documented for this species.
