= Chaeridiona mayuri =

Scientific classification
- Kingdom: Animalia
- Phylum: Arthropoda
- Class: Insecta
- Order: Coleoptera
- Suborder: Polyphaga
- Infraorder: Cucujiformia
- Family: Chrysomelidae
- Genus: Chaeridiona
- Species: C. mayuri

Binomial name
- Chaeridiona mayuri Shameem & Prathapan, 2014

Species of beetle

Chaeridiona mayuri is a species of beetle of the family Chrysomelidae. It is found in southern India.

== Life history ==
The recorded host plants for this species are Cheilocostus speciosus, Curcuma longula, Globba sessiliflora, Zingiber officinale and Zingiber zerumbet.
