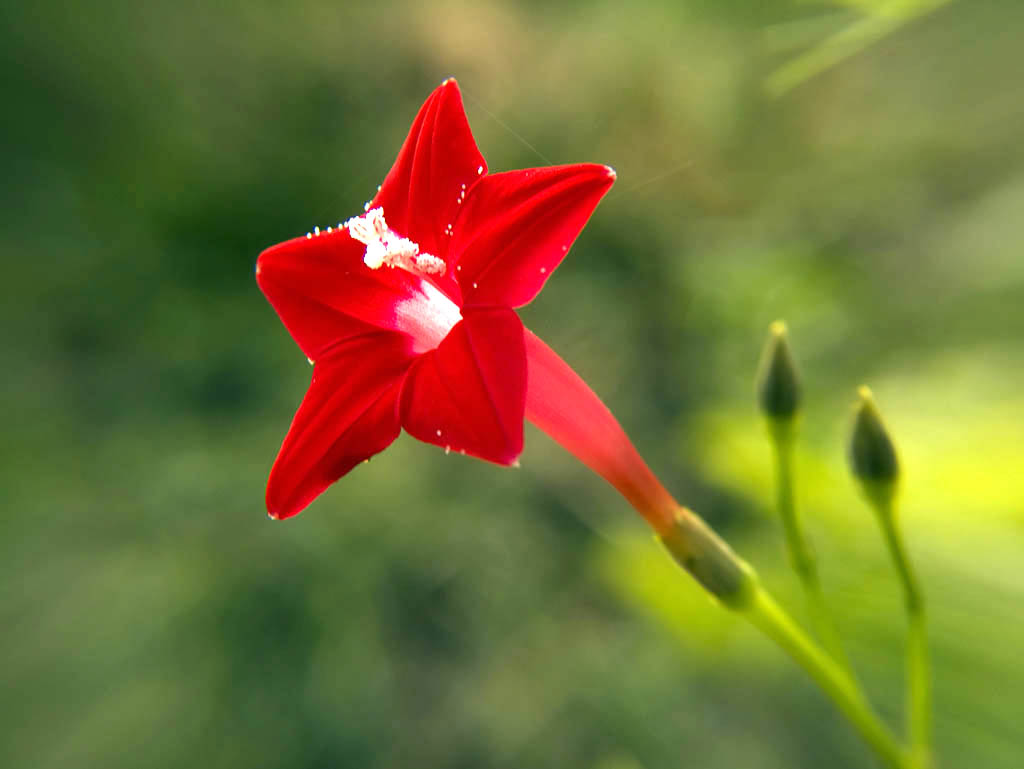

Scientific classification
- Kingdom: Plantae
- Clade: Embryophytes
- Clade: Tracheophytes
- Clade: Angiosperms
- Clade: Eudicots
- Clade: Asterids
- Order: Solanales
- Family: Convolvulaceae
- Genus: Ipomoea
- Species: I. quamoclit

Binomial name
- Ipomoea quamoclit L.

Synonyms
- Incarvillea argyi H.Lév.; Clitocyamos pinnatifidus St.-Lag.; Convolvulus pennatifolius Salisb.; Convolvulus pennatus Desr.; Convolvulus pennifolius Drapiez; Convolvulus quamoclit (L.) Spreng.; Ipomoea cyamoclita St.-Lag.; Quamoclit pennata Bojer; Quamoclit quamoclit (L.) Britton; Quamoclit vulgaris Choisy

= Ipomoea quamoclit =

Cypress vine

Species of flowering plant

Ipomoea quamoclit, commonly known as cypress vine, cypress vine morning glory, cardinal creeper, cardinal vine, star glory, star of Bethlehem or hummingbird vine, is a species of vine in the family Convolvulaceae native to tropical regions of the Americas and naturalized elsewhere in the tropics.

== Description ==
I. quamoclit is a herbaceous, twining vine growing up to 3–10 feet (0.91–3.05 m) tall. The leaves are 1–4 inches (25–102 mm) long, deeply lobed (nearly pinnate), with 9-19 lobes on each side of the leaf. The flowers are 1–2 inches (25–51 mm) long and 1 inch (25 mm) in diameter, trumpet-shaped with five points, and can be red, pink or white.

== Taxonomy ==
This species was first formally named by Carl Linnaeus in his seminal work Species plantarum (1753), but without any real detail as the plant was already well-known in most parts of the world. Curiously, he stated its origin as, simply, "Habitat in India", while at the same time referencing earlier describers of the plant who noted its origin as Central America.

=== Etymology ===
There are two schools of thought as to the origin of the species epithet quamoclit. The first, originally put forward by the French writer and botanist Alexandre de Théis, is that it is derived from Greek. The second is that the name comes from the Nahuatl language of Mexico. Neither explanation can be verified, although the botanist Daniel F. Austin makes an argument that the latter is the most likely.

=== Vernacular names ===
I. quamoclit has various names throughout India. In southern India, it is called mayil manikkam in Tamil: மயில் மாணிக்கம். In Malayalam, it is called ākāśamulla. In Assamese it is known as Kunjalata (কুঞ্জলতা), in Gujarati it is known as ગણેશ વેલ, while in the Marathi language it is known as Ganesh Vel. In Bangladesh, it has the vernacular names Tarulata, Kamalata, Kunjalata and Getphul. In Urdu-speaking areas, particularly around the Awadh region, it is known as Ishq Pecha (इश्क़ पेंचा).

In Telugu, it is called 'Kasiratnam'. In Mizo, it is called 'Rimenhawih'. In Jamaica, it is called 'Indian creeper'. In Nepal, it is known as "Jayanti Phool"(जयन्ती फूल).

== Distribution and habitat ==
This plant is native to northern South America north to Mexico but has been widely distributed throughout the world since Europeans first began to explore the Americas, initially becoming popular as a medicinal plant and later as an ornamental. It has become naturalised in many tropical areas and is considered an invasive weed in some.

== Cultivation and uses ==
It is widely cultivated as an ornamental plant throughout the tropics, and also outside of tropical regions, where it is grown as an annual plant only, not surviving temperate zone winters. In some tropical areas, it has become naturalized.

It flowers in summer and fall. Its seeds are sown in rainy season. It blooms continuously from August to December in temperate regions of the Northern Hemisphere and February to June in temperate regions of the Southern Hemisphere.

Seedlings must always be kept moist. They require full sun for good growth. This vine is one of the best plants for attracting hummingbirds, and is a vigorous grower. In warmer climates, this plant can be extremely invasive.

It doesn't require any fertilizer and gives blooms without any care. It can be grown anywhere. In containers along with other plants, it can be grown in small containers, or in big containers it thrives well in small spaces and big spaces alike.

Ipomoea × multifida is a hybrid between I. quamoclit (the cypress vine) and I. coccinea. The allotetraploid of this hybrid is Ipomoea × sloteri. Both are known as cardinal climber.

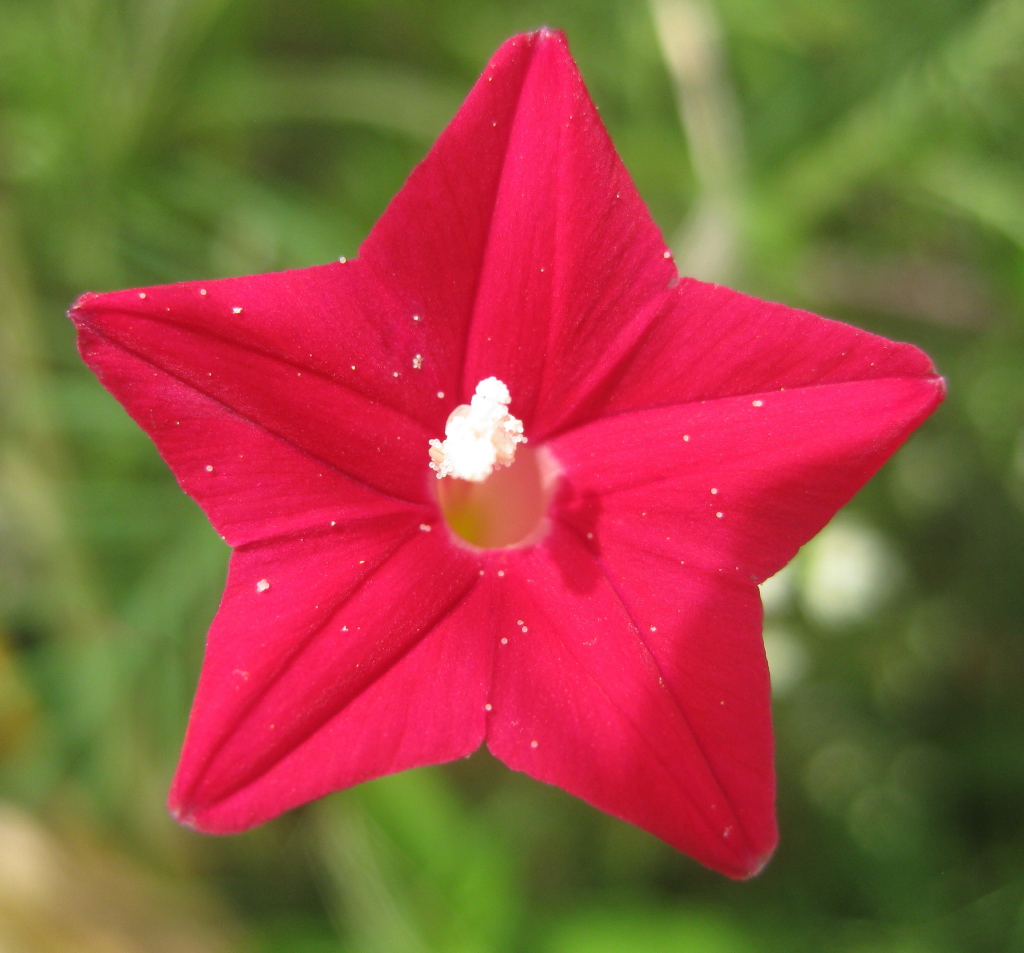
Flower

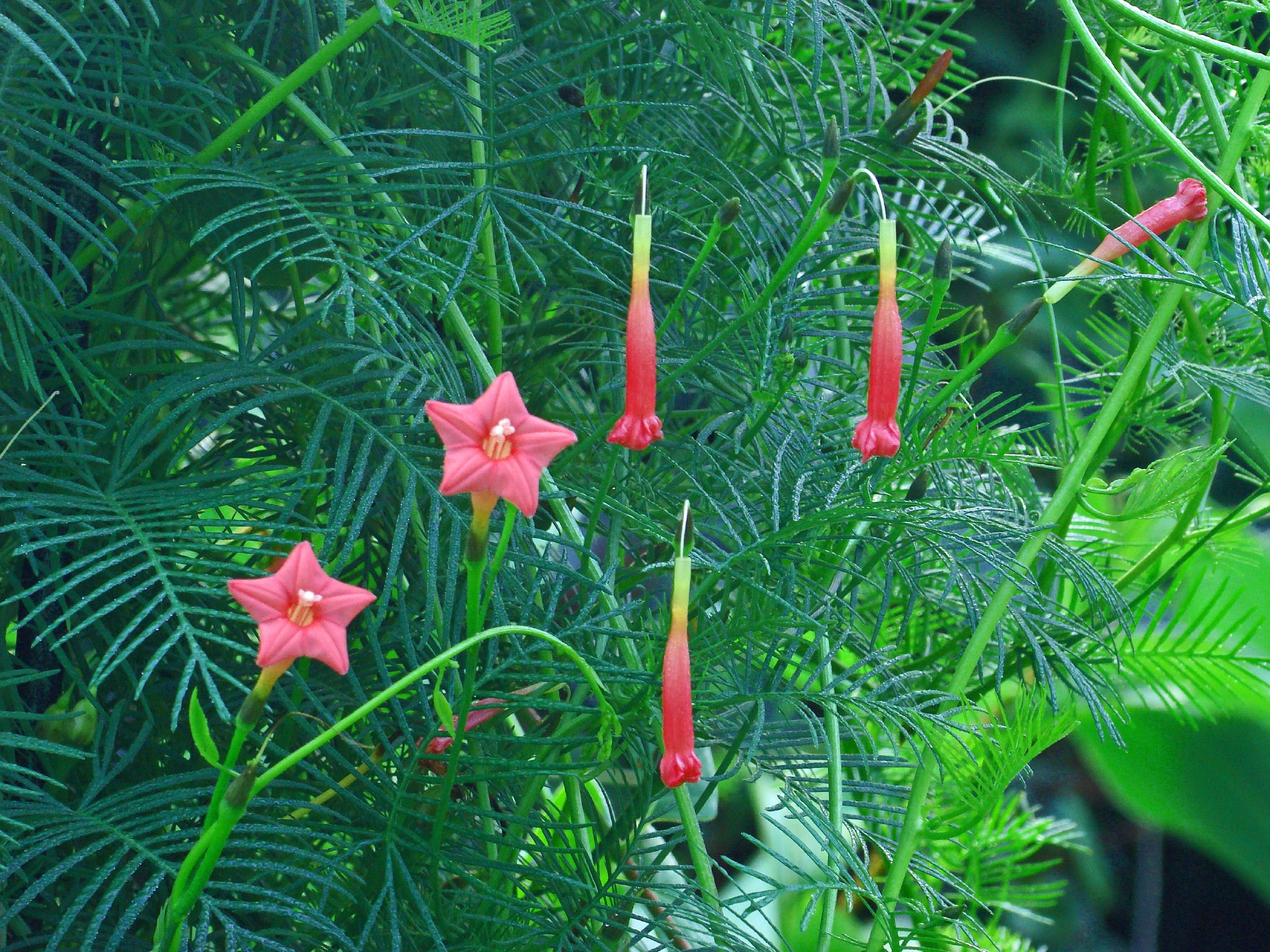
Flowers and foliage

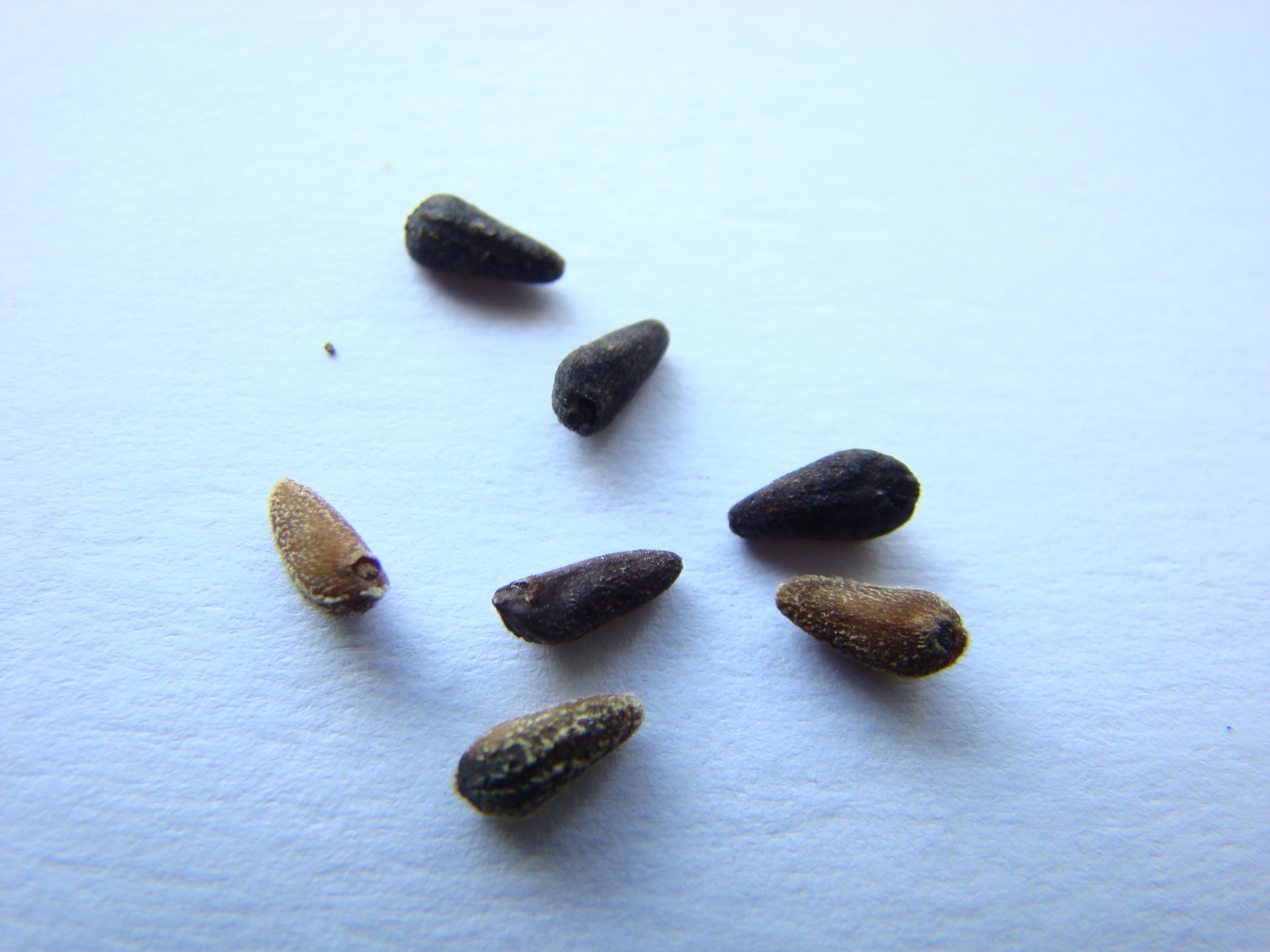
Seeds

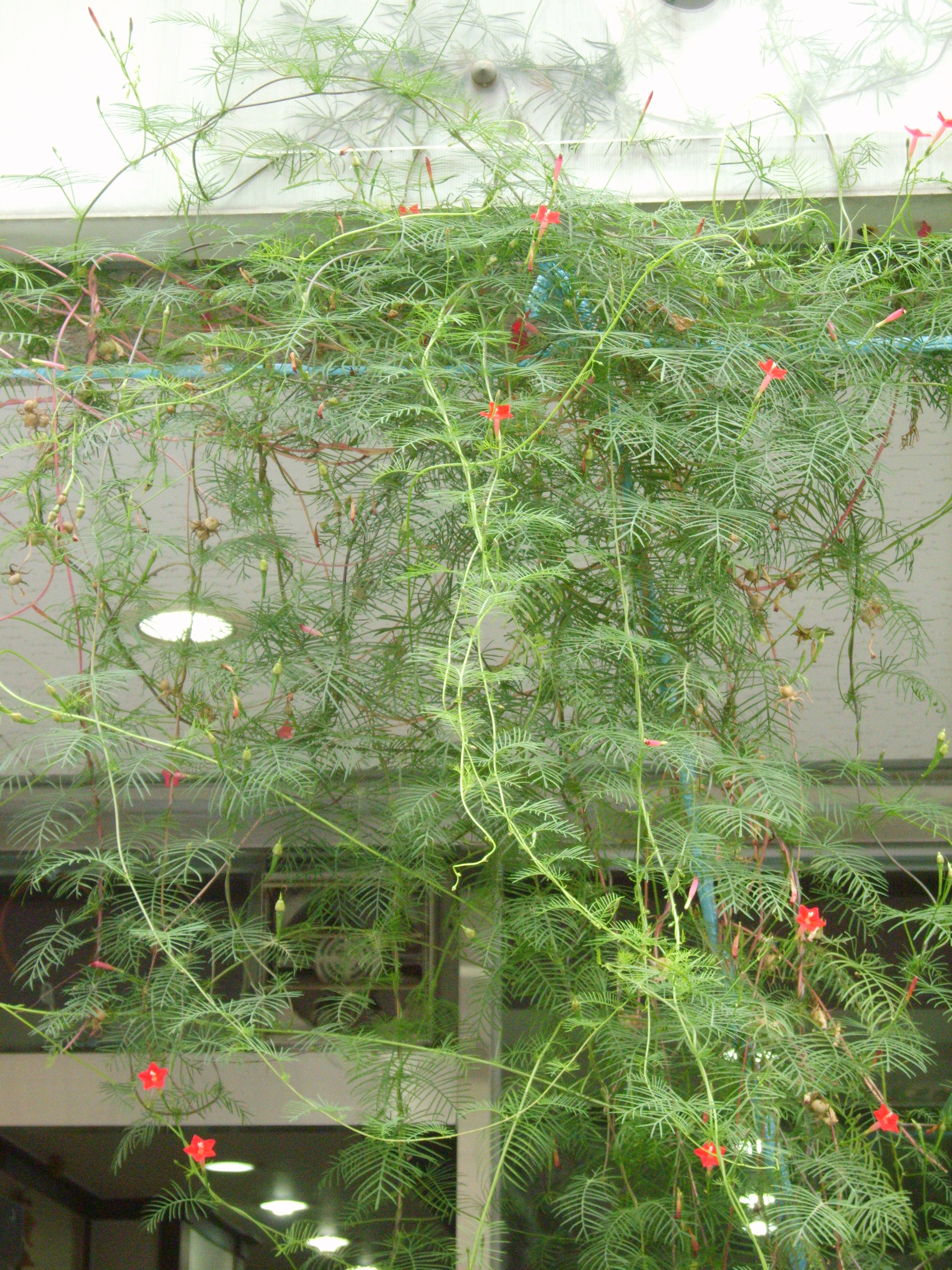
Form
