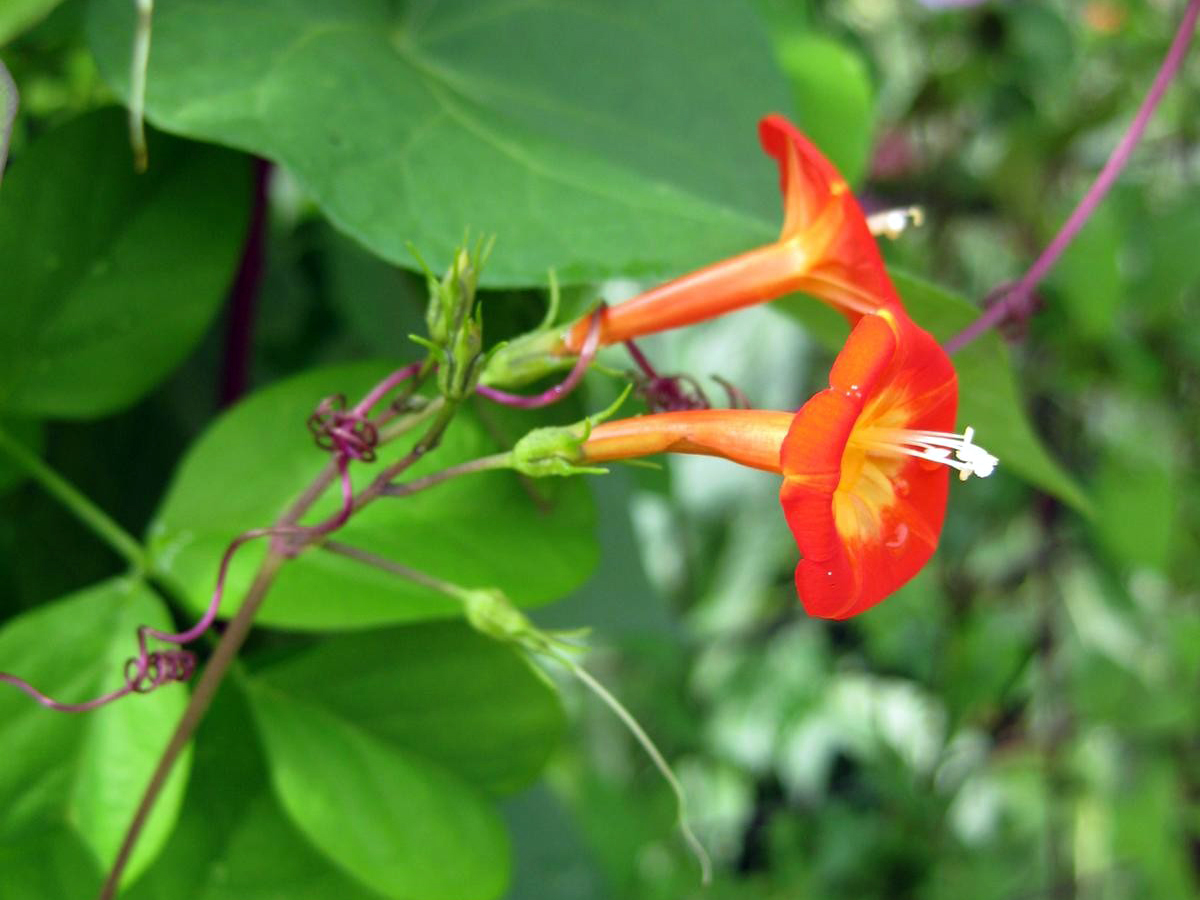

Scientific classification
- Kingdom: Plantae
- Clade: Tracheophytes
- Clade: Angiosperms
- Clade: Eudicots
- Clade: Asterids
- Order: Solanales
- Family: Convolvulaceae
- Genus: Ipomoea
- Species: I. coccinea

Binomial name
- Ipomoea coccinea L., 1753

= Ipomoea coccinea =

Red morning glory

Species of flowering plant

Ipomoea coccinea is a flowering plant in the family Convolvulaceae known by several common names including red morning glory, redstar and (ambiguously) Mexican morning glory.

It was first described by Linnaeus in 1753.

== Description ==
Red morning glories are fast growing, twisting climbing flowering vines that attract butterflies. The leaves are heart-shaped at the base, and commonly are three-lobed. They grow up to be about 50–100 mm (2–4 in) long and about half as wide. The vines can reach 3 m (10 ft) or more in length. The flowers are dull red with an orange throat. Red morning glory flowers are borne in clusters of a half dozen.

The species name coccinea is Latin for "scarlet", and refers to the color of the flowers.

== Habitat and ecology ==
Ipomoea coccinea is native to tropical America and have been introduced in much of the US. They can be found in disturbed areas along roads, stream banks, fence rows, old fields and other waste areas.

== Morphology ==
Ipomoea coccinea is often confused with Ipomoea quamoclit since the flowers are similar. However, the leaves of the two species are very different. Ipomoea quamoclit has leaves that are more divided, resembling a pine bough, and look more like a cypress vine. Ipomoea coccinea has a red-orange color while I. hederifolia has a darker red colour. Also, they have more of a pinched shaped seed. Their leaves are lobed but not separated into leaflets. There is one leaf per node along the stem; the edge of the leaf blade depends, some have teeth and lobes.

== Flowers and fruit ==
These flowers bear capsular fruits, with pedicels that are reflexed below the fruit but erect in the flower. The fruits are 6–7 mm across. Mature fruits are more spherical in shape and have a light brown colour and can contain up to 4 seeds. Seeds are more a wedge-shaped, about 3–4 mm long; this can range from dark brown to black. Every year about 1–4 seeds per fruit are most likely disperse. The capsule will appear brittle, showing that it will shatter upon contact with the ground, releasing the seeds.

== Usage ==
Red morning glory is an annual plant, so it can be grown as a climber over a fence to make a summertime screen and attract butterflies.

Ipomoea × multifida is a hybrid between I. quamoclit (the cypress vine) and I. coccinea. The allotetraploid of this hybrid is Ipomoea sloteri. Both are known as cardinal climber.

== Medicinal ==
The plant flowers between the months of November and January and fruits in January and February, in central India. The plant is cultivated in many parts of India as an ornamental plant but is also use as a medicinal property; they use the roots to induce sneezing.
